= List of casualties in Husayn's army at the Battle of Karbala =

This article contains the list of casualties of Husayn ibn Ali's relatives and companions in the Battle of Karbala. The battle took place on Friday Muharram 10, in the year 61 AH of the Islamic calendar (October 10, 680 CE) in Karbala, situated in present-day Iraq.

The battle was between Yazid's army from Syria reinforced by troops from Kufa, and the caravan of families and companions of Husayn ibn Ali, the grandson of the Islamic prophet, Muhammad. It is claimed that 72 males (including Husayn's 6 months old son) of Husayn's companions were killed by the forces of Yazid I.

== Army of Husayn ibn Ali ==
The following is a list of casualties of Husayn ibn Ali's companions in Battle of Karbala.

=== Members of Banu Hashim ===
These people were descendants of Abu Talib ibn Abd al-Muttalib and members of Banu Hashim who died in the Battle of Karbala.

==== Sons of Hussain ibn Ali ====
The following were sons of Hussain:

1. Ali al-Akbar
2. Ali Asghar

===== Sons of Ali ibn Abi Talib =====
The following were sons of Ali:

1. Husayn, son of Fatima.
2. Ja'far, half-brother of Husayn ibn Ali, son of Umm al-Banin.
3. Abd Allah, half-brother of Husayn ibn Ali, son of Umm al-Banin.
4. Uthman, half-brother of Husayn ibn Ali, son of Umm al-Banin.
5. Abbas, half-brother of Husayn ibn Ali, son of Umm al-Banin, the flag-bearer of Husayn's army.
6. Abu Bakr, half-brother of Husayn ibn Ali, son of Layla bint Mas'ud.
7. Muhammad al-Asghar, half-brother of Husayn ibn Ali, son of Layla bint Mas'ud.
8. Umar, half-brother of Husayn ibn Ali, son of Layla bint Mas'ud.

===== Sons of Hasan ibn Ali =====
The following were sons of Hasan ibn Ali (an elder brother of Husayn ibn Ali):

1. Al-Qasim
2. Abu Bakr
3. Abd Allah
4. Bishr

===== Sons of Abbas ibn Ali =====
The following were sons of Abbas ibn Ali (a brother of Husayn ibn Ali):

1. Qasim
2. Fadl

==== Descendants of Ja'far ibn Abi Talib ====
The following were descendants of Ja'far ibn Abi Talib (a brother of Ali) and the sons of Abd Allah ibn Ja'far:

1. Awn ibn Abd Allah ibn Ja'far, son of Zaynab bint Ali.
2. Muhammad ibn Abd Allah ibn Ja'far, son of Zaynab bint Ali.

==== Descendants of Aqil ibn Abi Talib ====
The following were descendants of Aqil ibn Abi Talib (a brother of Husayn's father Ali):

1. Ja'far ibn Aqil
2. Abd al-Rahman ibn Aqil
3. Abd Allah ibn Aqil
4. Muhammad ibn Abi Sa'id ibn Aqil

=== Companions of Muhammad ===
The following are the companions of Muhammad who died at the Battle of Karbala:

1. Anas ibn al-Harith al-Kahili
2. Muslim ibn Awsaja al-Asadi
3. Shabib Ibn Abdullah Al-Nahshali

=== Other companions of Husayn ibn Ali (non-Banu Hashim) ===
These are the companions of Husayn ibn Ali who died in the Battle of Karbala.

1. Zuhayr ibn al-Qayn al-Bajali, the commander of the right flank. He was a noble chieftain of his tribe, a man of great influence in Kufa. In the beginning, he was attached to Uthman, and once returning from Hajj; he met Husayn, and since then he became a follower of Husayn ibn Ali and a staunch devotee. He is the one who bade good-bye to his wife Dalham, daughter of Amr, liberating her with a divorce to go to her relatives and he joined Husayn and was killed.
2. Habib ibn Muzahir Al Asadi, a loyal companion of Ali, the commander of left flank of Husayn's army.
3. Burayr ibn Khudayr al-Hamdani, a very old, pious, and devoted companion of Husayn's father Ali, one of the prominent noblemen of Kufa. He came to Husayn begging him to permit him to be martyred, for he wanted to die in the way of God.
4. Umayya ibn Sa'd al-Ta'i, a companion of Husayn's father Ali.
5. Jundab ibn Hijr al-Khawlani, a companion of Husayn's father Ali.
6. Hajjaj ibn Masruq al-Ju'fi, a companion of Husayn's father Ali and muezzin of Husayn.
7. Nafi' bin Hilal al-Jamali, a companion of Husayn's father Ali and a noble personality of Kufa, escaped from Kufa and joined Husayn in Karbala.
8. Abu Wahab Abdullah ibn Umayr, initially a non Muslim, Wahab saw the sacrifice of Husayn ibn Ali and became Muslim and his companion, leaving his newly-wedded wife of 19 days behind, for the happiness of God.
9. Al-Hurr ibn Yazid Al-Tamimi, one of the commanders of the Umayyad army who defected to Husayn's side along with six others (including his two sons). When he was killed, Husayn said "Hurr, as thy mother has named thee Hurr (a free man) thou art Hurr in this world and the hereafter".
10. Bashir ibn Amr al-Kindi
11. Bakr ibn Hai al-Taymi
12. Jabib ibn Hajjaj al-Taymi, a follower of Muslim ibn Aqil in Kufa. When Muslim was arrested, he hid until Husayn arrived in Karbala and reported to Husayn and was killed in the battle.
13. Jabala ibn Ali al-Shaybani, served with Husayn's father Ali's companions, in the Battle of Siffin.
14. Jinadat ibn Ka'b Ansari al-Khazraji, killed along with his son.
15. Jawn bin Huwai, the liberated slave of Abu Dharr al-Ghifari, who, after the death of Abu Dharr, joined Husayn's brother Hasan, and thereafter remained with Husayn and came to Karbala with him.
16. Juwayn ibn Malik, from the tribe of Banu Tamim; he deserted Yazid's army and joined Husayn.
17. Hars, the liberated slave of Hamza ibn Abd al-Muttalib, the uncle of Muhammad.
18. Habshi ibn Qays al-Nahmi, from the tribe of Hamdan. His grandfather was one of the faithful of Muhammad.
19. Hars ibn Amr al-Qays al-Kindi
20. Habib ibn Amir al-Taimi, having already paid allegiance to Husayn at the hands of Muslim ibn Aqil, who was killed in Kufa, Habib left Kufa and joined Husayn on his way to Karbala and was killed.
21. Hajjaj ibn Badr al-Sa'di, from Basra of the tribe of Banu Sa'd.
22. Hallas ibn Amr al-Rasibi, the son of Amr al-Rasibi who was one of the companions of Husayn's father Ali.
23. Hanzala ibn As'ad al-Shibami, the one who carried the message of exhortation from Husayn to Umar ibn Sa'd in Karbala.
24. Raafi', the liberated slave of Muslim Azdi.
25. Zafir ibn Amr al-Kindi
26. Ziyad ibn Arib al-Saidi, the son of Arib one of the companions of Muhammad and also a traditionalist.
27. Sa'd, the liberated slave of Amr ibn Khalid.
28. Salim the liberated slave of Aamir al-Abdi, a devotee of Husayn's father Ali from Basra.
29. Sa'd ibn al-Harth al-Ansari and Abu al-Hutuf ibn al-Harth al-Ansari, twin brothers who had come from Kufa employed in the forces of the caliph to fight against Husayn. Later they deserted and joined Husayn's companions.
30. Sa'd, the liberated slave of Husayn's father Ali.
31. Sa'id ibn Abd Allah al-Hanafi, a noble, brave and influential personality from Kufa. He carried Muslim ibn Aqeel's letter from Kufa to Husayn and remained with him and was killed. When Husayn was offering prayers in Karbala, he stood in front of Husayn and was hit with arrows from Yazid's army on his chest, killing him.
32. Salman ibn Mazarih ibn Qais al Ammari al Bijjili, a cousin of Zohair al Qain. He went to Mecca with Zohair and when on his return he decided to join Husayn.
33. Sulayman ibn Razin, a liberated slave of Husayn He carried Husayn's letter to the devotess of the Ahl al-Bayt in Basra. Ubayd Allah ibn Ziyad, Umayyad governor of Basra, Kufa and Khurasan, caught him and the servant of Husayn accepted death willingly.
34. Sawar ibn Manyim e Nahmi, travelled from Iraq to join the forces of Husayn.
35. Suwayd ibn Amr al-Khath'ami, was seriously wounded in the fighting. He stayed on the ground, unconscious, the enemy thinking that he was dead. On regaining consciousness and hearing the rejoicing of the oppressor's forces that Husayn was killed, he got up and fought until he was also killed.
36. Sayf ibn al-Harith al-Hamdani and Malik ibn Abd Allah
37. Shabib ibn Abd Allah al-Nahshali, a liberated slave of Hars e Jabiri e Hamdani.
38. Shawdhab
39. Darghama ibn Malik al-Taghlibi, a devotee of Muslim ibn Aqeel in Kufa, who joined Husayn after Muslim's death, and was killed along with him.
40. Aaiz ibn Majma al Aazi, one of the six who along with Hur ibn Yazid e Riyahi had joined Husayn.
41. Abis ibn Abi Shabib al-Shakiri, helped Muslim ibn Aqeel in Kufa, and was killed at Karbala.
42. Amir ibn Muslim at Badi Basri, joined Husayn along with his liberated slave Salim, both the devotees of Husayn's father Ali in Basra, and were both killed.
43. Abdullah ibn Bushr Khashami, from Anmari e Khashami tribe, he came out of Kufa with Ibn Sa'd but joined Husayn and was killed with him.
44. Abdullah ibn Omair Kalbi, joined Husayn from Medina. His wife also accompanied him to serve the Holy Ladies. When Abdullah was killed, his wife sitting at the dead body of her husband said "O Abdullah ! Thou hath entered Paradise, take me along with Thee." The good Lady had not finished her lamentations when a slave of Shimar ibn Zeljosham delivered a blow on her head with an axe and she was killed.
45. Abdul Rahman and Abdullah, sons of Orawah ibn Harraq al Ghaffari. The two brothers were the noblemen of Kufa, and their grandfather Harraq was one of the companions of Husayn's father Ali. They joined Husayn and were killed.
46. Abd Allah ibn Yaqtar
47. Abde Qais Basri e Abdi
48. Abdullah ibn Zaid e Abdi
49. Abdul Ala ibn Yazid al Kalbi al Aleemi
50. Abd al-Rahman ibn Abd Rabb al-Ansari al-Khazraji
51. Abd al-Rahman ibn Abd Allah al-Arhabi
52. Abdul Rahman ibn Masood at Taimi
53. Amr ibn Junada al-Ansari
54. Omer ibn Zabiah Az Zabiyee, came out of Kufa with Ibn Sa'd but later joined Husayn and was killed.
55. Amr ibn Khalid al-Saydawi
56. Amr ibn Abd Allah al-Jundu'i, from the tribe of Hamdan.
57. Amru ibn Qarta al Ansari
58. Amru ibn Hab Abu Thamama al Sai'di
59. Harith ibn Amru ibn Shakir
60. Qarib ibn Abd Allah, the son of a liberated slave girl of Husayn. This lady after being freed by Husayn was married to a gentleman and brought her son Qarib, and presented him to Husayn, and he was brought up by Husayn.
61. Qasim ibn Habib al Azdi
62. Qasit ibn Zuhayr al-Taghlibi, Kurdus ibn Zuhayr al-Taghlibi and Muqsit ibn Zuhayr al-Taghlibi, sons of Zohair al Taghlabi.
63. Qanab an Namri
64. Qais ibn Mushir as Saidavi
65. Kannah at Taghlabi
66. Majma ul Jahni, the son of Ziad ibn Omar Jahni, one of the aged companions of Husayn.
67. Muslim ibn Kathir al-Azdi
68. Masood ibn Hajjaj Taimy and his son Abdur Rahman ibn Masood.
69. Munjih ibn Sahm, the liberated slave of Husayn's brother Hasan.
70. Mauq ibn Thamamah Asadi Saidavi Abu Musa
71. Nasr ibn Naizar, a liberated slave of Husayn's father Ali. He was presented to Muhammad by the King of Persia and Muhammad presented him to Husayn's father Ali who freed him. He came to Karbala and was killed.
72. Wazeh the Turk, a Turkish liberated slave of Harse Mashaji. He came to Karbala and presented himself to Husayn and was killed.
73. Yazid ibn Ziyad b. Muhasir
74. Yazid Ibn Maghful Jafi, a devotee of Husayn's father Ali.
75. Sa’d ibn Al-Hurr
76. Adham ibn Omayya al Abdi
77. Aslam, a slave who was purchased and liberated by Husayn.
78. Umm Wahab
79. Yazid ibn Thubayt al-Abdi al-Basri
80. Amr ibn Qaraza
81. Malik ibn Abd Allah al-Hamdani
82. Sulayman ibn Kathir
83. Salim ibn Amr ibn Abd Allah
84. Sa'd ibn Hanzala al-Tamimi
85. Abu Thumama al-Sa'idi, companion of Ali ibn Abi Talib and Hussain ibn Ali, noblemen of Kufa.
86. Amir ibn Muslim al-Abdi, died in the first raid.
87. Amr ibn Dubay'a
88. Harith ibn Nabhan

== See also ==
- Family tree of Ali
- Ashura
- Tasu'a
- Sermon of Zaynab bint Ali in the court of Yazid
- Sermon of Ali ibn Husayn in Damascus
- Arba'een Pilgrimage
- Ziyarat Ashura
- Bani Hashim
- Bani Asad
