= Abu Wahab Abdullah ibn Umayr =

Muslim martyr

Abdullah ibn Umayr al-Kalbi عَبْد ٱلله ٱبْن عُمَيْر ٱلْكَلْبِيّ

Personal life
- Died: 10th of Muharram, 61 A.H. / 10 October, 680 AD
- Cause of death: Killed in the Battle of Karbala
- Resting place: Karbala, Iraq
- Known for: Being a companion of Husayn ibn Ali

Religious life
- Religion: Islam

ʿAbd Allāh ibn ʿUmayr al-Kalbī (Arabic: عَبْد الله بِن عُمَيْر الْكَلْبِيّ), also known as Abū Wahb (Arabic: أبو وهب), was one of the companions of Husayn ibn Ali, who was killed along with him in the Battle of Karbala (680). He belonged to the Kalb tribe, the majority of whom were adherents of Christianity at that time. His wife Umm Wahab was amongst the female casualties in Husayn's army at the Battle of Karbala.

== Early life and conversion to Islam ==
Wahab was a Christian by birth and converted to Islam. He was a known businessperson of Kufa. Wahab discussed with his mother and wife before converting to Islam and later joining Husayn ibn Ali in the battle against Yazid's forces. Wahab was returning from Kufa after getting married. He was still seventeen years and his wife was just twelve years old. When Wahab was passing from Karbala he saw Husayn ibn Ali surrounded by the enemies and was along with his family and very few friends.

Wahab was inspired by Al Husayn's spiritual charisma in such a manner that he was reluctant to leave him despite being aware of the consequences of staying with him. Wahab was a tall and masculine man with broad shoulders, who was held with very high esteem among his people, and was known of his courage and soldierly experience.

On the preceding night of Ashura the following conversion was held between Wahab and his mother:

Wahab asked her: 'Mother! What should I do in this situation?' The mother asked Wahab: 'How do you feel yourself, my son?' Wahab said: 'In my opinion Husayn is on the just path and it would be cowardly and against all traditions of Arab chivalry and gallantry to leave the side of a man so isolated and surrounded by blood-thirsty enemies.' The mother said: 'But that means definite death.' Wahab replied: 'Yes I know, but my heart tells me that this is the right thing to do, in these circumstances.' The mother then said: 'If that is how you feel then we will stay with Husayn.'

Wahab's mother then pleaded on his behalf and said:

"O grandson of the Prophet of Islam! It will be an honor for me if my son fights for you and gives his life protecting you." Husayn was still reluctant to accept Wahab as one of his soldiers and advised him not to risk his life that too in a matter which concerns Muslims. When Abu Wahab saw this, he said:

'O grandson of the Prophet of Islam! If that is the case then, from this moment on, I am a Muslim.' Wahab testified (Shahada) that: “There is no deity besides Allah and Muhammad is His messenger”

== Wahab's Duel in Battle of Karbala ==
After Wahab converted to Islam, he was granted permission by Husayn ibn Ali to fight the Yazid's forces on his side. In the first campaign of battle of Karbala, Yasir, Ziyad's slave and Salim, Ibn Ziyad's slave set out and challenged anyone from Husayn ibn Ali's army to have a duel with them. At this, Habib ibn Muzahir and Burayr expressed their desire to take up the challenge nevertheless they were denied permission by Husayn ibn Ali. When Wahab asked for the permission, Husayn granted him permission believing him to be match for both the challengers.

Wahab stepped into the battlefield and the challengers asked his identity to which he introduced himself. However they could not recognize him and asked either Zuhayr ibn al-Qayn, Habib ibn Muzahir or Burayr to fight them. Yasir was standing nearby to whom Wahab said "You son of the adulteress! Do you not wish to fight me?!" saying this he attacked Yasir and engaged him in a sword duel but at the same time Salim charged at him with his sword. Wahab while protecting himself lost fingers of his left hand and in retaliatory attack he killed Salim and Yasir. After killing both of them he moved back to Al Husayn while reciting Martial poetry.

Umm Wahab was watching every thing. After witnessing a brave combat of her son she came to Wahab and said: “May both my parents be sacrificed for you! Do defend the good ones, the offspring of Muhammad, Allah's peace and blessings be upon him and his progeny!”

She did not leave and wanted to die with him, however Husayn ibn Ali intervened and said: “May you be well rewarded on behalf of your Prophet's Ahl al-Bayt! Go back to the tent! Women are not required to fight!” and she followed the instructions.

== Harith ibn Shakir Friend of Abdullah ibn Umayr Abu Wahab al-Kalbi ==
Harith ibn al-Shakir also popularly known as Harith ibn Amr ibn Shakir was one of the prominent companions of the grandson of Muhammad, the prophet of Islam, Husayn ibn Ali who was one of the martyrs of the battle of Karbala in 680 AD. He was from Banu Shakir clan of the Great Banu Hamdan tribe, a well-known tribe that dates back to the first millennium BCE and originated in area around the present day Yemen. He was among the famous people of Kufa, an ancient city that holds the remains of Husayn ibn Ali. It was reported that Harith ibn Amr ibn Shakir was a very wealthy merchant and powerful public speaker in Kufa during his days.

        Upon the death of Mu'awiya in 680 AD, Harith ibn al-Shakir and many other conspicuous follower and communal Supporter of Husayn ibn Ali sent letters to Husayn ibn Ali inviting him to take the place of Mu'awiya and rule Kufa, they all pledge their allegiance in the same year and promised supports to him.

== Death ==
Wahab participated in the retaliatory attack when Shimr attacked Al Husayn's right wing. Wahab in that engagement killed 31 of them, of which 19 were Horsemen and 12 were Footmen. His right hand was severed by Hani ibn Thabit al-Hadrami and left hand by Bakr ibn Hayy having left without arms he was taken captive and killed on that spot. Wahab was then beheaded and his head was thrown towards Husayn ibn Ali's camp, it was picked up by his mother, she took it, wiped the blood from it then ran in the direction of the enemy forces. Husayn ibn Ali sent her back saying, “Go back, may Allah have mercy on you, for you are exempted from participating in Jihad.” She went back saying, “O Allah! Do not disappoint me!” Al Husayn said to her, “May Allah never disappoint you!”

== Death of Umm Wahab at Karbala ==
Umm Wahab, wife of Abdullah was the daughter of Abdullah, who belonged to Al Nimr ibn Qasit, was reported to have approached Husayn ibn Ali and asked him 'Are you the rightful Imam ?' Husayn replied: 'Yes, I am.' She said: 'Then if Wahab dies protecting you, he would go to the Paradise?' Husayn said: 'Yes, he would.' Then she said:'Can you promise me that you would not let Wahab enter Paradise without me ?' Husayn said:' Yes, I promise you, you and Wahab will enter Paradise together.'

When Wahab was killed, she walked towards his corpse and sat by his headless body, saying, “Congratulations for having earned Paradise! I plead to Allah Who blessed you with Paradise to make me join you.” Shimr heard her and ordered his slave Rustam to hit her head with a rod or mace, which he did. She died there.

== See also ==
- Burayr ibn Khudayr al-Hamdani
- Husayn ibn Ali
- Battle of Karbala
- Mourning of Muharram
- Ashura
