= Nafi' bin Hilal al-Jamali =

People killed at the Battle of Karbala

Nafi' ibn Hilal al-Jamali نَافِع ٱبْن هِلَال ٱلْجَمَلِيّ

Personal life
- Died: 10th of Muharram, 61 A.H. / 10 October, 680 AD
- Cause of death: Killed in the Battle of Karbala
- Resting place: Karbala, Iraq
- Known for: Being a companion of Husayn ibn Ali

Religious life
- Religion: Islam

Nafi' ibn Hilal al-Jamali (Arabic: نَافِع ٱبْن هِلَال ٱلْجَمَلِيّ) was a companion of Ali ibn Abi Talib, originally from Yemen He fought alongside Ali in the First Fitna, and later joined Husayn ibn Ali at the Battle of Karbala where he was killed.

== Background ==
He was one of the companions of Ali ibn Abi Talib. He had been with Ali ibn Abi Talib in all of his battles: Siffin, Nahrawan, and Jamal. Before Muslim ibn Aqil was killed in Kufa, joined to Husayn's caravan and came with him to Karbala.

== In Karbala ==
In battle of Karbala Nafi' had written his name on the arrows by poison and shot them and recited: "I shoot it, and its tips trained, In poison, on the wind borne, To fill the earth with shots, and the soul, Is not benefited by fear at all.

Twelve men of enemy were killed by Nafi' ibn Hilal then his arms were injured by stones that were shot by enemies and he was taken as a captive. Shimr and his soldiers carried him to Umar ibn Sa'd. After a conversation between them Ibn Sa'd ordered to Shimr to kill him and Shimr cut off his head.

== See also ==
- List of casualties in Husayn's army at the Battle of Karbala
- Burayr ibn Khudayr al-Hamdani
