= Sa'd (slave) =

Saʿd the slave of ʿAmr (ʿUmar) ibn Khalid al-Saydawi سَعد مَولى عَمرو بن خالِد الصَیداوی

Personal life
- Died: 10th of Muharram, 61 A.H. / 10 October, 680 AD
- Cause of death: Killed in the Battle of Karbala
- Resting place: Karbala, Iraq
- Known for: Being a companion of Husayn ibn Ali

Religious life
- Religion: Islam

Saʿd the slave of ʿAmr (ʿUmar) b. Khalid al-Saydawi (Arabic: سَعد مَولى عَمرو بن خالِد الصَیداوی) was martyred at the Battle of Karbala.

== Biography ==
Sa'd was the slave of Abu Khalid Amr ibn Khalid al-Saydawi. His master has been mentioned to be Amr or Umar ibn Khalid. The name of Sa'd's father is unknown. Some resource mentioned that the name of Sa'd's father was 'Abd Allah.

== Joining of Husayn ibn Ali ==
Sa'd and his master Amr were among those who left Kufa with the guidance of Al-Tirimmah to join the caravan of Husayn ibn Ali in Udhayb al-Hijanat. Hurr wanted to capture them or make them return, but Husayn prevented him.

== In the Battle of Karbala ==
The four who had joined Husayn in 'Udhayb al-Hijanat attacked the army of Umar ibn Sa'd. The soldiers of 'Umar ibn Sa'd surrounded them and cut their connection with other companions of Husayn. Then, Abbas ibn Ali attacked the army of 'Umar b. Sa'd and rescued them. Once again, they attacked and fought until they were martyred in one place. He is buried in the mass grave of the martyrs of Karbala in the Holy Shrine of Husayn.
