= Abu Hajal Muslim ibn Awsaja =

Companion of the Islamic prophet Muhammad

- Born: أَبُو حَجَل مُسْلِم ٱبْن عَوْسَجَة ٱلْأَسَدِيّ
- Died: 680; Karbala
- Known for: Companion of Muhammad and martyr of Karbala
- Father: Awsaja ibn Sa'd ibn Tha'laba ibn Dudan ibn Asad ibn Khuzayma al-Asadi

Abū Ḥajal Muslim ibn ʿAwsaja al-Asadī (Arabic: أَبُو حَجَل مُسْلِم ٱبْن عَوْسَجَة ٱلْأَسَدِيّ) was a companion of the Islamic prophet Muhammad. He assisted Muslim ibn Aqil in Kufa. Then he joined Husayn ibn Ali army with his family. He was killed in battle of Karbala.

== Name and lineage ==
He is Muslim son of Awsaja son of Sa'd son of Tha'laba son of Dudan son of Asad son of Khuzayma al-Asadi. His Kunya is Abu Hajal. He was a companion of Husayn ibn Ali. Muslim ibn Awsaja and Habib ibn Muzahir both were from the tribe of Banu Asad.

== In Kufa ==
Muslim ibn Awsaja supported Husayn ibn Ali's ambassador, Muslim ibn Aqil, in Kufa with weaponry and tried to take oath of allegiance for Husayn ibn Ali. The spy of Ubayd Allah ibn Ziyad, Ma'qil, found the safe house of Muslim ibn Aqeel through Muslim ibn Awsaja. Consequently, Hani ibn Urwa who sheltered Muslim ibn Aqil in his house was arrested. Then Muslim ibn Aqil to organizing an army chose Muslim ibn Awsaja as commander of Banu Asad and Madh'hij and some other commanders. Soon after Hani ibn Urwa and Muslim ibn Aqil were killed by Ubayd Allah ibn Ziyad, and Muslim ibn Awsaja hided in a safe house for a while. Afterward he joined Husayn ibn Ali army with his family in Karbala.

== In Karbala ==
=== The Night before Ashura ===
At Tasu'a night, Husayn ibn Ali told his soldiers:

You are allowed to leave Karbala and your promises and oath of allegiance have served well so far, you are not obligated to stay for the battle.

Then, some companions proclaimed their allegiance and loyalty to Husayn ibn Ali over again. After the descendants of Banu Hashim, Muslim bin Awsaja was the first one who said:

Oh, Abu Abd-Allah! We would never leave you alone. How it is possible to bring excuses to Allah? O, by Allah, never! We will never leave you alone; I will never give up; I will slay the enemies with my spear and sword until it drops on the ground; then I stone them. By Allah, I would never leave you alone until I fulfill my duties to Allah and defend the descendants of Prophet Muhammad. O, by Allah, if I am perished, I would reborn, and then if I am burnt and turned into ashes, I would reborn; and if it happens seventy times I would reborn and fight for you until I am martyred for you. I would never leave you as I know I will be perished once. Consequently, eternal prosperity and dignity would be mine.

==== His motto in the battle of Karbala ====
He repeatedly expressed this motto in the battle of Karbala:

If you desire to know me, I am brave as a lion; my lineage goes back to Banu Asad. If you treat me with tyranny, you are strayed from the right path, and you are guilty of ingratitude toward Allah.

Asad means lion.

== Death ==
Muslim ibn Awsaja was the first one who was killed in the battle of Karbala before Amr ibn Qartah. He was about 70 years old.

== See also ==
- List of casualties in Husayn's army at the Battle of Karbala
- Ashura
- Tasu'a
- Burayr ibn Khudayr al-Hamdani
