= Al-Abdi =

Al-Abdi is an Arabic surname, meaning the servant. Notable people with the name include:

- Abdallah ibn Sawwar al-Abdi, Umayyad military commander and governor
- Amir ibn Muslim al-Abdi, companion of Husayn ibn Ali
- Al-Harith ibn Murra al-Abdi, Rashidun military leader and chief justice
- Yazid ibn Thubayt al-Abdi al-Basri, companion of Husayn ibn Ali

== See also ==
- Abdi
