= Abd al-Rahman ibn Abd Rabb al-Ansari al-Khazraji =

Abd al-Rahman ibn Abd Rabb al-Ansari al-Khazraji عبد الرحمن بن عبد رب الأنصاری الخزرجی

Personal life
- Died: 10th of Muharram, 61 A.H. / 10 October, 680 AD
- Cause of death: Killed in the Battle of Karbala
- Resting place: Karbala, Iraq
- Known for: Being a companion of Ali, Hasan ibn Ali and Husayn ibn Ali

Religious life
- Religion: Islam

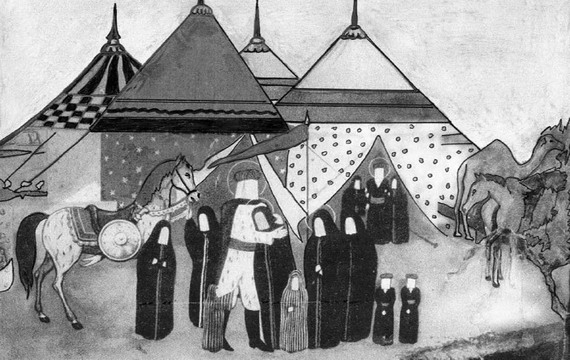
Imam Husayn ibn ‘Alī ibn Abī Tālib bidding farewell to his family before marching to Karbalā’

Abd al-Rahman ibn Abd Rabb al-Ansari al-Khazraji (Arabic: عبد الرحمن بن عبد رب الأنصاری الخزرجی) was among companions of the Prophet and Ali who was martyred in the Battle of Karbala.

== Witness the Event of Ghadir ==
Abd al-Rahman was among companions of the Prophet who witnessed day of Ghadir and transmitted the al-Ghadir Hadith. On the day of al-Ruhba, Ali ibn Abi Talib asked those of Companions who had witnessed the day of Ghadir to give testimony about the succession of the Prophet. So some of companions like Abd al-Rahman ibn Abd Rabb al-Ansari stood up and said that: "we testify that we heard that the Prophet said, Beware that God, the Almighty and Glorious is my master and I am the master of believers; beware that whoever I am his master, Ali is his master."

Ali taught him the Qur'an.

== In the Battle of Karbala ==
According to some sources, Abd al-Rahman joined the caravan of Husayn ibn Ali from Mecca. It is narrated that on the day of Tasu'a, Burayr ibn Khudayr al-Hamdani was joking with Abd al-Rahman. Abd al-Rahman told him: "It is not the time of joking now." Burayr answered: "O brother! My relatives know that when I was young, I was not a man of joking, lest I be so in my old ages. But, I know what we meet soon. By God I swear, the distance between us and the big-eyed houris is the attack of these people with their swords, and how much I love it to be now."

he was martyred during the first attack of the army of Umar ibn Sa'd.
