= Muqsit ibn Zuhayr al-Taghlibi =

Umayyad rebel

Muqsit b. Zuhayr al-Taghlibi مُقسِط بن زُهَیر بن حَرث التَغلِبی

Personal life
- Died: 10th of Muharram, 61 A.H. / 10 October, 680 AD (aged 75)
- Cause of death: Killed in the Battle of Karbala
- Resting place: Karbala, Iraq
- Known for: Being a companion of Hussain ibn Ali

Religious life
- Religion: Islam

Muqsit b. Zuhayr al-Taghlibi (Arabic: مُقسِط بن زُهَیر بن حَرث التَغلِبی) was a companion of Hussain ibn Ali who was killed in the Battle of Karbala. He was also a companion of Imam Ali. According to some sources, he was martyred in the first attack of Umar ibn Sa'ad's army.

== Biography ==
Muqsit accompanied Ali ibn Abi Talib in various battles including battles of Jamal, Siffin, and Nahrawan. He was also a member of Hasan ibn Ali military forces in Kufa.

== In the Battle of Karbala ==
After Hussain's caravan reached Karbala, he and his brothers, Kurdus and Qasit, joined the Hussain's army overnight. He was killed on the Day of Ashura.

== Sources ==
- Shaykh Abbas Qummi, Nafasul Mahmum; Relating to the heart rending tragedy of Karbala
