= Sa'd ibn al-Harth al-Ansari =

Sa'd ibn al-Harth al-Ansari سَعد بن الحَرث [الحارِث] الأنصاري

Personal life
- Died: 10th of Muharram, 61 A.H. / 10 October, 680 AD
- Cause of death: Killed in the Battle of Karbala
- Resting place: Karbala, Iraq
- Known for: Being a companion of Husayn ibn Ali

Religious life
- Religion: Islam

Sa'd ibn al-Harth al-Ansari (Arabic:سَعد بن الحَرث (الحارِث) الأنصاری) was martyred in the Battle of Karbala On the day of Ashura 61/680.

== In Battle of Karbala ==
Sa'd was from Khazraj tribe. Sa'd and his brother, Abu al-Hutuf ibn al-Harth al-Ansari, were among the Khawarij in Battle of Nahrawan and had come from Kufa with the army of Umar ibn Sa'd to fight with Husayn.

After all the companions of Husayn ibn Ali were martyred in the afternoon of Ashura, Husayn called, "Oh, isn't there any helper to help us? Oh, isn't there any defender to defend the family of the Prophet?" Women and children in the tents of Husayn heard the call and began crying. When Sa'd and his brother, Abu al-Hutuf, heart the cries of the woman and children, they shouted the slogan of Khawarij, "No rule, but God's and no obedience to the one who has disobeyed Him", and then declared that "Husayn was son of the daughter of the Prophet, the intercession of whom for ourselves we wish on the Day of Judgment. How can we fight him while he is in such a state, has no helper, and stands alone in the desert of Karbala, asking for help?"

They turned against Umar ibn Sa'd's army and unsheathed their swords. Sa'd and his brother killed many soldiers until they too were martyred.

However, another source narrates the story in a slightly different manner. It is said that after the martyrdom of Husayn and when they heard cries of women, they attacked the army of 'Umar ibn Sa'd and were martyred.
