= Yazid ibn Ziyad b. Muhasir =

Yazid ibn Ziyad ibn Muhasir یَزید بن زیاد بن مُهاصِر

Personal life
- Died: 10th of Muharram, 61 A.H. / 10 October, 680 AD (aged 75)
- Cause of death: Killed in the Battle of Karbala
- Resting place: Karbala, Iraq
- Known for: Being a companion of Hussain ibn Ali

Religious life
- Religion: Islam

Yazid ibn Ziyad ibn Muhasir, known as Abu l-Shaʿtha al-Kindi, was in the army of Umar ibn Sa'd at first but then he joined the army of Hussain ibn Ali. He was martyred in the Battle of Karbala.

== Lineage ==
Yazid ibn Ziyad ibn Muhasir was from the Kinda tribe from the Banu Bahdala clan. His kunya was Abu l-Sha'tha.

== Companion of Hussain ibn Ali ==
When Ibn Ziyad sent a letter to Hurr ibn Yazid, Abu l-Sha'tha recognized the person who delivered the letter since they were from the same tribe, and so he told him: “May your mother sit in mourning for you! What is the message that you delivered?”

He replied: “I obeyed my imam (leader, that is, Ibn Ziyad) and stayed loyal to my allegiance to him”.

Abu l-Sha'tha said: “You have disobeyed God and obeyed your imam to your own destruction and you have gained shame and fire.” He left Kufa before Hurr ibn Yazid and his army approached the caravan of Hussain, and then joined him.

According to another account, he accompanied the army of Umar ibn Sa'd from Kufa to Karbala. But when he found that Hussain ibn Ali's proposals were rejected, he joined the army of Hussain.

== On the day of Ashura ==
He fought while riding his horse. When his horse was slaughtered, he squatted near Hussain and threw 100 arrows to the army of Umar ibn Sa'd. After throwing each of the arrows he sang paeans.

When Abu l-Sha'tha' ran out of arrows, he stood up and said: “Only five arrows did not hit the targets”.

He fought until he was martyred.
