= Amr ibn Dubay'a =

Umar ibn Dhubayʾa عَمرو بن ضُبَیعَة بن قیس بن ثَعلَبة الضُبَعی

Personal life
- Died: 10th of Muharram, 61 A.H. / 10 October, 680 AD (aged 75)
- Cause of death: Killed in the Battle of Karbala
- Resting place: Karbala, Iraq
- Known for: Being a companion of Ali ibn Abi Talib, Hassan ibn Ali and Hussain ibn Ali

Religious life
- Religion: Islam

Umar ibn Dhubayʾa was a martyr in the Battle of Karbala and companion of Husayn ibn Ali.

He was from the tribe of Qays ibn Thalabah. He was considered one of the first martyrs of the campaign. He was born in Kufa before the death of Muhammad.

== In Karbala ==
Umar ibn Dhubayʿa was on the side of Umar ibn Sa'd's army. However, when he saw that the suggestions of Hussain ibn Ali were not accepted by the army of Umar b. Sa'd and they did not allow him to return, he joined Husayn. He was martyred in the first attack of the army of Umar b. Sa'd.

He is in the Ziyarat al-Shuhada.
