= Sayf ibn al-Harith al-Hamdani =

Arab martyr

Sayf ibn al-Harith al-Hamdani سیف بن الحارث بن سُرَیع الهمدانی

Personal life
- Died: 10th of Muharram, 61 A.H. / 10 October, 680 AD
- Cause of death: Killed in the Battle of Karbala
- Resting place: Karbala, Iraq
- Known for: Being a companion of Husayn ibn Ali

Religious life
- Religion: Islam

Sayf ibn al-Harith al-Hamdani was martyred on the day of Ashura in the Battle of Karbala.

== Lineage ==
Sayf ibn Harith (Harath) ibn Suray ibn Jabir al-Hamdani al-Jabiri was from Bani Jabir, a branch of Hamdan tribe who were originally from Yemen and lived in Kufa.

== In the Battle of Karbala ==
Sayf ibn Harith ibn Suray and Malik ibn Abd Allah were cousins. They went to Karbala and joined the companions of Husayn ibn Ali.

On the Day of Ashura, when they saw Husayn confronting the army of the enemy, they went to him crying. Husayn told them, "O cousins! Why are you crying? By God, I hope your eyes will soon be brightened [to heaven]."

They answered, "May God sacrifice us for you; by God we swear we are not crying for ourselves, but our crying is because we see you besieged and cannot defend you."

Husayn said, "May God give you the best of rewards He gives to the God-wary for your companionship and defense."

After Hanzala ibn As'ad al-Shibami was martyred, Sayf and Malik greeted Husayn. Husayn answered their greeting and they moved toward the enemy. They fought while they supported each other until they both were martyred.
