= Harith ibn Nabhan =

Harith ibn Nabhan الحارِث بن نَبهان

Personal life
- Died: 10th of Muharram, 61 A.H. / 10 October, 680 AD (aged 75)
- Cause of death: Killed in the Battle of Karbala
- Resting place: Karbala, Iraq
- Known for: Being a companion of Hussain ibn Ali

Religious life
- Religion: Islam

Harith ibn Nabhan (Arabic: الحارث بن نبهان) was a martyr in the battle of Karbala.

== Biography ==
His father, Nabhan, was the slave of Hamza ibn 'Abd al-Muttalib. Nahban was a brave horseman who died two years after the martyrdom of Hamza. Harith was a companion of Ali ibn Abi Talib and Hasan ibn Ali. He accompanied Hussain ibn Ali to Karbala and was martyred in the first attack of the army of Umar ibn Sa'd.
