= Juwayn ibn Malik =

Juwayn ibn Malik جُوَین بن مالِک

Personal life
- Died: 10th of Muharram, 61 A.H. / 10 October, 680 AD
- Cause of death: Killed in the Battle of Karbala
- Resting place: Karbala, Iraq
- Known for: Being a companion of Ali ibn Abi Talib and Husayn ibn Ali

Religious life
- Religion: Islam

Juwayn ibn Malik (or al-Tamimi) (Arabic: جُوَین بن مالِک) was martyred in the Battle of Karbala.

== In the Battle of Karbala ==
As a member of 'Umar ibn Sa'd army, he came to Karbala to fight with Husayn ibn Ali. However, when he saw that Ubayd Allah ibn Ziyad did not accept the suggestion of Husayn and they engaged in a war, he joined Husayn at night with some people of his tribe. They have been mentioned as seven people. He was martyred in the first attack of the army of Ibn Sa'd on the Day of Ashura. His name has been mentioned in Ziyara al-Shuhada: "Peace be upon Juwayn ibn Malik al-Duba'i."
