= Muslim ibn Kathir al-Azdi =

Martyr of the battle of Karbala

Muslim ibn Kathir Azdi مسلم بن کثیر ازدی

Personal life
- Died: 10th of Muharram, 61 A.H. / 10 October, 680 AD (aged 75)
- Cause of death: Killed in the Battle of Karbala
- Resting place: Karbala, Iraq
- Known for: Being a companion of Hussain ibn Ali

Religious life
- Religion: Islam

Muslim ibn Kathir Azdi (مسلم بن کثیر ازدی) known as al-A'raj was among the companions of Hussain ibn Ali who was killed in the battle of Karbala.

== Biography ==
Muslim was also a companion of Ali ibn Abi Talib. He accompanied Ali in various battles including the battle of Jamal when his foot was wounded by Amr ibn Dabba al-Tamimi and became paralyzed, he was called al-A'raj.

== In the Battle of Karbala ==
Muslim was among those who wrote letter to Hussain ibn Ali and invited him to Kufa. In Kufa, he helped Muslim ibn Aqil and after Muslim was left alone, he went out of Kufa and joined Hussain near Karbala and was killed in the first attack of the army of Umar ibn Sa'd.

His name is mentioned in the Ziarat al-Rajabiyya of Hussain as Sulayman: "Peace be upon Sulayman ibn Kathir".
