= 2008 Karbala bombing =

Terrorist incident in Iraq in 2008

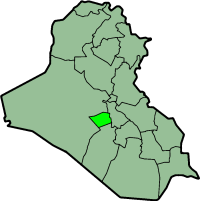
- Location of Karbala
- Location: Karbala, Iraq
- Date: 17 March 2008 (UTC+3)
- Attack type: suicide bomb
- Deaths: At least 22
- Injuries: 58
- Perpetrator: Unknown
- Motive: Anti-Shi'a sentiment

The 2008 Karbala bombing occurred on 17 March 2008 in Karbala, Iraq.

The suicide bomb detonated outside a cafe near the shrine. The bombings killed at least 22 people and injured 30. The dead include seven Iranians.

== Background ==
Karbala is a city in central Iraq, 80 km (50 mi) south of Baghdad. It is home to the Imam Husayn Shrine, one of the holiest sites of Shiite Islam. The city had seen several other suicide bombs in the past, including one in April 2007 that killed about 50 people.

There were two other insurgent attacks the day of the bombing, including a mortar attack and several suicide bombs, both in Baghdad. The attacks coincided with a visit by US Vice President Dick Cheney.

== Perpetrator ==
No organization has claimed responsibility. Iraqi officials suspected that insurgents affiliated with the Islamic State of Iraq carried out the bombing. The governor of Karbala province said the bomber had been a woman but gave few other details.
