= Al-Hajjaj ibn Masruq al-Ju'fi =

Islamic martyr

Al-Hajjaj ibn Masruq al-Madhhiji al-Juʿfi الحَجّاج بن مَسروق المذحجی الجُعفی

Personal life
- Died: 10th of Muharram, 61 A.H. / 10 October, 680 AD
- Cause of death: Killed in the Battle of Karbala
- Resting place: Karbala, Iraq
- Known for: Being a companion of Ali ibn Abi Talib and Husayn ibn Ali

Religious life
- Religion: Islam

Al-Hajjaj ibn Masruq al-Madhhiji al-Juʿfi (Arabic: الحَجّاج بن مَسروق المذحجی الجُعفی) was a devotee Shi'a and companion of Ali ibn Abi Talib and Husayn ibn Ali. He was eventually martyred at the Battle of Karbala.

== Companion of Husayn ibn Ali ==
When al-Hajjaj learned about Husayn ibn Ali's departure to Mecca, he moved from Kufa to Mecca and later, accompanied Husayn's caravan to Kufa.

In the Dhu Husam station, where the caravan of Husayn encountered the army of Kufa under the leadership of Hurr ibn Yazid al-Riyahi, Husayn ordered al-Hajjaj ibn Masruq to recite adhan (call for prayers) at noon.

When the caravan arrived in the Qasr ibn Bani Muqatil station, Husayn saw a tent. He asked about the owner of the tent, and he was told that it belonged to Ubayd Allah ibn al-Hurr al-Ju'fi. Husayn ibn Ali sent al-Hajjaj ibn Masruq to him to call him to help him, but he rejected the call.

== On the day of Ashura ==
al-Hajjaj went to the battlefield. After a while he returned to the Husayn ibn Ali with a bloodstained body, and recited the following poem:

"may my life be sacrificed for you—the guiding and the guided. I will meet your grandfather, the Prophet, today. And then I will meet your father, Ali; the great man who I know as the successor of the Prophet."

Husayn told him: "Yes. And I will meet them after you."

Al-Hajjaj returned to the battlefield then, and fought until he was martyred.
