= Muhammad al-Asghar ibn Ali =

Son of Ali ibn Abi Talib

Muhammad al-Asghar ibn Ali محمد الأصغر بن علي

Personal life
- Died: 10th of Muharram, 61 A.H. / 10 October, 680 AD Karbala, Umayyad Caliphate
- Cause of death: Killed in the Battle of Karbala
- Resting place: Imam Husayn Shrine, Karbala, Iraq
- Parents: Ali (father); Layla bint Mas'ud (mother)
- Known for: Being a companion of Husayn ibn Ali

Religious life
- Religion: Islam

Muḥammad al-Aṣghar ibn ʿAlī (Arabic: محمد الأصغر بن علي) is one of Ali's sons. There are different mentions about who his mother's name is, such as Layla bint Mas'ud, Umama bint Abi al-As, Warha' and Asma bint Umais. Although some sources have not mentioned about his attendance in (the battle of) Karbala, and are actually in doubt about that, there are many sources which consider him among the martyrs of Karbala; and his name is available as martyr in both Shia and Sunni sources.

He was among the children of Ali and was called Muhammad al-Asghar and was smaller than Muhammad ibn al-Hanafiyya. Muhammad ibn Ali had a hard war with his brother's (Husayn) enemies, and killed many of Kufa's army. Eventually, a man from Bani Aban ibn Darim killed him. The name of Muhammad ibn Ali is available in Ziyarat al-Nahiya al-Muqaddasa, and has been addressed and greeted of Muhammad al-Mahdi.
