= Amr ibn Abd Allah al-Jundu'i =

Companion of Hussain ibn Ali

Abd Allah ibn Aqil عَمرو بن عبداللّه الجُنْدُعی

Personal life
- Died: 10th of Muharram, 61 A.H. / 10 October, 680 AD (aged 75)
- Cause of death: Killed in the Battle of Karbala
- Resting place: Karbala, Iraq
- Known for: Being a companion of Hussain ibn Ali

Religious life
- Religion: Islam

Amr ibn Abd Allah al-Junduʿi (Arabic:عَمرو بن عبداللّه الجُنْدُعی ) was among companion of Hussain ibn Ali who was martyred on the day of Ashura in the Battle of Karbala.

== Biography ==
Amr ibn Abd Allah al-Junduʿi was from Hamdan tribe and joined the army of Hussain ibn Ali.

== On the day of Ashura ==
According to some sources, Amr was martyred in the first attack of the army of Umar ibn Sa'd to the companions of Hussain before the day of Ashura but In other sources, it is mentioned that Amr fell unconscious due to many wounds he received and a strike at his head and his family took him out of the battlefield, and he died one year later. In Ziyara of al-Shuhada, we read, "Peace and greetings be upon the wounded who passed away out of the battlefield."
