= Amr ibn Khalid al-Saydawi =

Amr ibn Khalid al-Saydawi عمرو بن خالد الاسدی الصیداوی

Personal life
- Died: 10th of Muharram, 61 A.H. / 10 October, 680 AD (aged 75)
- Cause of death: Killed in the Battle of Karbala
- Resting place: Karbala, Iraq
- Known for: Being a companion of Ali ibn Abi Talib, Hassan ibn Ali and Hussain ibn Ali

Religious life
- Religion: Islam

Amr ibn Khalid al-Asadi Saydawi (عَمرو بن خالِد الاَسَدی الصَیداوی) was a Kufan companion of Hussain ibn Ali who participated in the Battle of Karbala.

== On the day of Ashura ==
Escaping the army of Ibn Ziad, Amr fled from Kufa accompanied by his servant Sa'd, Mujammi' ibn Abd Allah al-A'idhi and Nafi' ibn Hilal and with the guidance of Tirimmah joined the caravan of Hussain ibn Ali in Udhayb al-Hijanat. Hurr wanted to capture or return them, but Hussain prevented him from that.

On the Day of Ashura, Amr and his servant with some others first attacked the army of Umar ibn Sa'd, then the army of Umar ibn Sa'd besieged them. Abbas ibn Ali attacked the army of Umar ibn Sa'd and rescued them. They attacked once again and fought until they were all martyred in one place.
