= Abu Bakr ibn Ali =

Son of Ali ibn Abi Talib

Abu Bakr ibn Ali ibn Abi Talib أَبُو بَكْر بن عَلِيُّ بن أبي طالِب

Personal life
- Born: 658 AD / 38 AH Kufa, Rashidun Caliphate
- Died: 10th of Muharram, 61 A.H. / 10 October, 680 AD Karbala, Umayyad Caliphate
- Cause of death: Killed in the Battle of Karbala
- Resting place: Imam Husayn Shrine, Karbala, Iraq
- Parents: Ali (father); Layla bint Mas'ud (mother)
- Known for: Being a companion of Ali ibn Abi Talib, Hasan ibn Ali and Husayn ibn Ali

Religious life
- Religion: Islam
- Arabic name
- Personal (Ism): Abdullah عَبْدُ ٱلله
- Patronymic (Nasab): Ibn ʿAlī ibn Abī Ṭālib ibn ʿAbd al-Muṭṭalib ibn Hāshim ibn ʿAbd Manāf ibn Quṣayy ibn Kilāb ibn Murrah بْنُ عَلِيٍّ بْنُ أَبِي طَالِبٍ بْنُ عَبْدِ ٱلْمُطَّلِبِ بْنُ هَاشِمٍ بْنُ عَبْدِ مَنَافٍ بْنُ قُصَيٍّ بْنُ كِلَابٍ بْنُ مُرَّةَ
- Teknonymic (Kunya): Abū Bakr أَبُو بَكْر
- Toponymic (Nisba): Al-Hāshimī al-Qurashī الهاشِميُّ القُرَشيُّ

Abu Bakr Abdullah ibn Ali (Arabic: أبو بكر عبد الله بن علي) was reportedly the son of Ali ibn Abi Talib and Layla bint Mas'ud. He was among companions of Husayn who was martyred at the Battle of Karbala. His birth name was Abdullah, he was given the Kunya Abu Bakr after he grew into adulthood.

== Lineage ==
Abu Bakr ibn Ali was martyred during the Battle of Karbala. He was the son of Ali ibn Abu Talib. His martyrdom is commemorated during the month of Muharram.

Historical accounts vary regarding the details of his death. Some sources attribute his martyrdom to a member of the Hamdan tribe, as mentioned in a hadith attributed to Muhammad al-Baqir. Other accounts suggest his body was found in a creek, leaving uncertainty about the circumstances and the perpetrator. His grave is believed to be among those of the Hashimid martyrs at the Holy Shrine of Imam al-Husayn in Karbala.

Abu Bakr ibn Ali is mentioned in the ziyarat (visitation) of Imam al-Husayn, reflecting his honored status among Shia Muslims for his role during the tragic events at Karbala.

== In the Battle of Karbala ==
Abu Bakr ibn Ali was martyred at the Battle of Karbala. There is a hadith from Muhammad al-Baqir according to which a man from the Hamdan tribe martyred him. However, some scholars hold that Abu Bakr's corpse was found in a creek, and so it is not known who martyred him. According to some sources, his grave is located in the mass grave of Hashimid martyrs in the Holy Shrine of Imam al-Husayn near his burial place.

Abu Bakr ibn Ali is mentioned in one of Imam al-Husayn ziyarat.
