= Abu Thumama al-Sa'idi =

Abu Thumama al-Ṣa'idi ابوثمامه الصائدی
- Title: al-Asadi (ٱلْأَسَدِيّ)

Personal life
- Died: 10th of Muharram, 61 A.H. / 10 October, 680 AD (aged 75)
- Cause of death: Killed in the Battle of Karbala
- Resting place: Karbala, Iraq
- Known for: Being a companion of Ali ibn Abi Talib, Hassan ibn Ali and Hussain ibn Ali

Religious life
- Religion: Islam

Abu Thumama al-Ṣa'idi (Arabic: ابو ثمامة الصائدی) also known as Amr ibn Abd Allah ibn Kaʿb (Arabic: عمر بن عبدالله بن کعب) was a prominent companion of Ali ibn Abi Talib and Hussain ibn Ali. He was one of the noblemen of Kufa who invited Hussain to Kufa. He participated in the Battle of Karbala and was killed there on the day of Ashura.

== Life ==
After Mu'awiya's death, he was among the people who gathered in the house of Sulaymanibn Surad al-Khuza'i to invite Hussian ib Ali to Kufa and he sent a letter to Mecca to him.

He was considered a great horse rider and was a prominent Shi'a in Kufa. While Muslimibn 'Aqil was in Kufa, he raised people's charity, managed financial affairs and bought weapons.

In the uprising of the people of Kufa against Ubayd Allahibn Ziyad, Muslimibn Aqil assigned Abu Thumama as the commander of the Tamim and Hamdan tribes.

Adopting the policy of bribing and terrifying the heads of important tribes, Ubayd Allah ibn Ziyad dispersed people from around Muslim ibn Aqil and killed him. After Muslimibn Aqil, Ubayd Allahibn Ziyad pursued Abu Thumama. He hid in his tribe for some days, then secretly left Kufa along with Nafi'ibn Hilal. He joined Hussain ibn Ali on his way from Mecca to Kufa and accompanied him to Karbala.

His actions on the day of Ashura included preventing Kathiribn 'Abd Allah al-Sha'bi, the herald of Umaribn Sa'd, from carrying his weapon before Hussain. At noon, he mentioned that the noon prayer's time had come, and Hussain ibn Ali asked Allah's blessing for him. After that, he continued fighting until he was killed.
