= Sulayman ibn Kathir =

Sulayman ibn Kathir سلیمان بن کثیر

Personal life
- Died: 10th of Muharram, 61 A.H. / 10 October, 680 AD (aged 75)
- Cause of death: Killed in the Battle of Karbala
- Resting place: Karbala, Iraq
- Known for: Being a companion of Hussain ibn Ali

Religious life
- Religion: Islam

Sulayman ibn Kathir (Arabic: سلیمان بن کثیر) was martyred at the Battle of Karbala. His name was mentioned in al-Ziyara al-Rajabiyya for Hussain ibn Ali and al-Ziyara for Ali Akbar and other martyrs of Karbala.

Some have considered it possible that he was, in fact, Muslim ibn Kathir al-Azdi. No information is found about his personality, life, lineage or family.
