= Anas ibn al-Harith al-Kahili =

Participant of the Karbala battle

Anas ibn al-Harith al-Kahili انس بن حارث کاهلی

Personal life
- Died: 10th of Muharram, 61 A.H. / 10 October, 680 AD
- Cause of death: Killed in the Battle of Karbala
- Resting place: Karbala, Iraq
- Known for: Being a companion of Prophet and Husayn ibn Ali

Religious life
- Religion: Islam

Anas ibn al-Ḥārith al-Kāhilī (Arabic: انس ابن حارث کاهلی) was a companion of the Prophet who fought at the Battle of Karbala and was killed on the day of Ashura.

== Companion of the Prophet ==
As a companion of the Prophet, Anas participated in the battles of Badr and Hunayn. His father, Harith ibn Nabih was also among the companions of the Prophet and among the Companions of Suffa.

Ibn al-Athir in Usd al-ghabah says that Anas was one of the natives of Kufa. Anas was transmitter of a hadith from the Prophet which is mentioned in both Shia and Sunni sources. He said, "I heard from the Prophet saying: "Surely, this son of mine (i.e. Husayn) will be killed in a land Karbala; so, anyone of you who sees that among you, should help him."

== Joining Husayn ibn Ali ==
To evade the approaching war, Anas left Kufa. However, when in Qasr Bani Muqatil, he heard the conversation between Husayn and Ubayd Allah ibn Hurr al-Ju'fi (who had left Kufa for the same reason), he changed his mind and joined Husayn and said, “By God I swear that I exited Kufa except that like Ubayd Allah ibn Hurr, I disliked fighting with you or against you, but God guided my heart to help you and accompany you.”

== Warning Umar ibn Sa'd ==
Before Ashura, Anas went to Umar ibn Sa'd to advise him. When he arrived to Umar, he did not say Salaam to him.

Umar said, "Why didn’t you say Salaam to me? Am I not a Muslim?”

Anas said, "By God I swear you are not a Muslim, because you want to kill the son of the Prophet .”

Umar hung his head [in shame] and said, "By God I swear I know the murderer of Husayn is in the [hell] fire, but there is no escape from the order of Emir Ubayd Allah ibn Ziyad.”

Anas came back to Husayn and informed him of Umar's talk.

== Battle of Karbala ==
As Ibn Nima al-Hilli narrates in Muthir al-Ahzan, Anas went to the battlefield saying:

“Tribes Kahil, Dawdan, Khandaf and Qays ‘Alyan all know that my tribe is destroyer of all rivals; O companions! Be like a roaring lion Surely Al Ali [family of Ali] are followers of the All-Compassionate God and Al Harb [family of war] (Banu Sufyan) are followers of Satan."

After he killed some of the enemy, he was killed. His name is mentioned in the Ziarat al-Nahiya al-Muqaddasa.
