= Jawn bin Huwai =

John Mawla Al Hussein

Jawn bin Huwai جَوْن ٱبْن حُوَيّ

Personal life
- Died: 10th of Muharram, 61 A.H. / 10 October, 680 AD
- Cause of death: Killed in the Battle of Karbala
- Resting place: Karbala, Iraq
- Known for: Being a companion of Husayn ibn Ali

Religious life
- Religion: Islam

Jawn bin Huwai (Arabic: جَوْن ٱبْن حُوَيّ), also spelled Jawn bin Huwayy, was a Nubian Christian freedman who died in battle as part of Husayn ibn Ali's army at the Battle of Karbala on Muharram 10, 61 AH (680 AD). Jawn was a former slave of Abu Dharr al-Ghifari. When Abu Dharr was exiled from Medina by Uthman ibn Affan, Jawn went to Ali ibn Abi Talib who invited him to stay on as his companion. When Ali ibn Abi Talib was killed, Jawn stayed with Ali's son Hasan ibn Ali and after Hasan's death, he moved in with Husayn ibn Ali. When Husayn left Medina, Jawn insisted on accompanying him.

== Battle of Karbala ==
At Karbala, Jawn could always be seen at the side of Husayn. He was an old man, dark with gray curly hair. Because of his profound knowledge and pleasant manners he was greatly respected. On the night before Ashura, Imam urged Jawn to go away to seek his safety by telling him "You have accompanied us all the way but now you may go" to that Jawn replied "how is it fair that I benefit from your company and hospitality but abandon you in your hardship?"

Jawn spent the whole night of Ashura sharpening his sword. On the following day he helped in repelling the first two attacks from Yazid's army. At mid-day, after the Zuhr prayers, Jawn came to Husayn, and stood silently. Husayn looked at Jawn and said, "Jawn, I know you have come for my permission to go to the battlefield. You have been a good and trusted friend. I will not deny you martyrdom for Islam. Go, Allah be with you!" Jawn smiled happily. He faced the enemy and recited a poem which said:

I am a soul willing to die for Allah,
and have a sword thirsty of the blood of his enemies
Before I die I shall fight the enemies of Allah,
with my sword and my tongue serve the grandson of his prophet

Jawn fought while reciting the poem. He received several mortal blows but his recitation of the poem continued. Jawn fell from his horse, he still continued to fight with his tongue by reciting the poem. At which point a few horsemen moved to where he lay. Jawn, the Abyssinian, was silenced.

== See also ==
- List of casualties in Husayn's army at the Battle of Karbala
- Battle of Karbala
- Husayn ibn Ali
- Ahl al-Bayt
- Shia Islam
