= Zuhayr ibn al-Qayn =

Member of the Bajila tribe in Iraq

Zuhayr ibn Al-Qayn Al-Bajali زُهَيْر ٱبْن ٱلْقَيْن الهیچکی ٱلْبَجَلِيّ
- Born: Iraq
- Died: 10th of Muharram, 61st Islamic year (October 10, 680 CE); Karbala, Iraq
- Cause of death: Martyred in the Battle of Karbala
- Known for: Participation in the Battle of Karbala against Yazid I's armed forces
- Opponent: Umayyad Caliph Yazid I & his armed forces
- Family: Bajila (tribe)

Zuhayr ibn Al-Qayn Al-Bajalī (Arabic: زُهَيْر ٱبْن ٱلْقَيْن ٱلْبَجَلِيّ, Persian: زهیر بن قین بجلی), was a member of the Bajila tribe in Iraq and a companion of Husayn ibn Ali, Muhammad's grandson and son of Ali ibn Abi Talib. He was martyred during the battle of Karbala

== Battle of Karbala ==
Zuhayr ibn al-Qayn is best known for his participation in the Battle of Karbala. Despite the fact that he did not want to even speak to Husayn, he eventually spoke to him when his tribe met his companions and his wife influenced him into speaking with Husayn. After meeting Husayn, Zuhayr divorced his wife (so that she could remarry after his martyrdom) and volunteered to join his army against the forces of Yazid I.

In the morning of Ashura, he suggested to Husayn ibn Ali that: "fighting these people, now, will be easier for us than fighting those who will come against us after them." Husayn replied: "I will not begin to fight against them." In the battle, the right side of Husayn ibn Ali's army was commanded by Zuhayr ibn al-Qayn.

When Zuhayr was called back from fighting to pray, Husayn ibn Ali asked him and a few other men to hold a shield and protect the women and men who are praying. Zuhayr stood in front of the Imam and blocked every arrow shot at him. Zuhayr found 2 arrows on his chest and his arm.

== Death ==
Zuhayr was killed in the occasion of Karbala when two men under Shimr's command speared him from the back and the front side. It is said that (before he was martyred) he managed to defeat 100 men single-handedly.

== See also ==
- Abbas ibn Ali
- Qasim ibn Hasan
- Muslim ibn Aqil
- Burayr ibn Khudayr al-Hamdani
- List of casualties in Husayn's army at the Battle of Karbala
