= Amr ibn Junada al-Ansari =

Amr b. Junada al-Ansari عمر بن جندب انصاری

Personal life
- Died: 10th of Muharram, 61 A.H. / 10 October, 680 AD
- Cause of death: Killed in the Battle of Karbala
- Resting place: Karbala, Iraq
- Known for: Being a companion of Husayn ibn Ali

Religious life
- Religion: Islam

Amr b. Junada al-Ansari (Arabic: عمر بن جندب انصاری) was among the companions of Husayn ibn Ali and the martyrs of Karbala.

== Lineage ==
His father, Junada ibn Harath was among the companions of the Prophet and followers of Ali ibn Abi Talib who participated in the Battle of Siffin. his mother was Bahriyya, daughter of Mas'ud al-Khazraji, who was among women present in Karbala. Some sources have mentioned his name Umar.

== Joining Husayn ibn Ali ==
Amr ibn Junada was 21 years old or in another resource was 11 or 9 years old when He joined Husayn with his mother and father in Mecca.

== In the battle of Karbala ==
After martydom of Amr's father, his mother ordered him to go and fight the enemy, telling him, "My son! Go and help al-Husayn!" He went to Husayn and asked for permission to go to the battlefield. First, Husayn did not give permission, so Amr once again mentioned his request. Then, Husayn said, "This young man's father has been martyred; so, maybe his mother would not like him to go to the battlefield." He said, "O son of the Prophet! My mother has ordered me to help you and has put on me the clothes for fighting." Thus, Husayn gave him permission and he went to the battlefield.

In the battlefield, Amr shouted this war cry: "My commander is Husayn and what a good commander he is. He is the delight of the heart of the Prophet, giving glad tidings and the warner. His father is Ali and his mother is Fatima. Do you anyone like him? He has a face of bright sun and a forehead like the moon."

Some have also reported that he shouted the war cry as following: "I will make breathing difficult for son of Hind and I will shoot arrow at his throat; by the help of the horsemen of the Helpers and the Immigrants who colored their spears with the blood of disbelievers under the dust of the battlefield. At the time of the Prophet of God, Muhammad, spears were colored and today they will be colored by the blood of mischief-makers. They will be colored with the blood of people left the Qur'an to help villains and they seek their blood spilt in the Battle of Badr and they hid it under sharp swords and erected spears. By God I swear, I will hit mischief-makers with sharp sword. Today, this is the right upon me and obligatory for me an everyday, it is to be encountered and to be helped."

It is reported that 'Amr fought with the enemies until he was martyred. Malik ibn Nasr beheaded him and threw his head toward the army of Imam al-Husayn. Amr's mother picked up his head and said, "Bravo my son! O delight of my heart and O light of my eyes!" Then she threw the head toward one of the people of the enemy. Then, she pulled the pole of the tent and by which attacked the enemy. Husayn ibn Ali brought her back and prayed for her.
