= Kurdus ibn Zuhayr al-Taghlibi =

Kurdus ibn Zuhayr al-Taghlibi کُرْدُوس بن زُهیر بن حرث التغلبی

Personal life
- Died: 10th of Muharram, 61 A.H. / 10 October 680 AD (aged 75)
- Cause of death: Killed in the Battle of Karbala
- Resting place: Karbala, Iraq
- Known for: Being a companion of Hussain ibn Ali

Religious life
- Religion: Islam

Kurdus ibn Zuhayr al-Taghlibi was a companion of Ali ibn Abi Talib who was killed at the Battle of Karbala in 680 CE.

== Companion of Imam Ali ==
Kurdus ibn Zuhayr is referred to as Kurdus, son of the chief of Taghlib tribe. He was a companion of Ali ibn Abi Talib who attended the battles of Jamal, Siffin, and Nahrawan along with him.

In the book, al-Mazar, by al-Shahid al-Awwal, and Bihar al-anwar he is mentioned as Kursh.

== Death ==
He was also a member of Hussain’s military force in Kufa. Before Hussain's arrival in Karbala, he and his brothers, Qasit and Muqsit joined the Imam’s army. He was martyred on the Day of Ashura. It is said that he was martyred in the first attack of Umar ibn Sa'd's army.

He is mentioned in Ziarat al-Shuhada: "peace be upon Qasit and Kurdus, the sons of Zuhayr al-Taghlibi".
