= Salim ibn Amr ibn Abd Allah =

Shia martyr

Salim ibn Amr ibn Abd Allah سالِم بن عَمْرو بن عَبْدالله

Personal life
- Died: 10th of Muharram, 61 A.H. / 10 October, 680 AD (aged 75)
- Cause of death: Killed in the Battle of Karbala
- Resting place: Karbala, Iraq
- Known for: Being a companion of Hussain ibn Ali

Religious life
- Religion: Islam

Salim ibn Amr ibn Abd Allah (Arabic: سالِم بن عَمْرو بن عَبْدالله) was martyred in the Battle of Karbala. He accompanied Muslim ibn Aqil in his uprising, and after Muslim's martyrdom, left Kufa to join Hussain ibn Ali's army.

== Joining Muslim ibn Aqil ==
Salim ibn Amr ibn Abd Allah was a servant of the Banu l-Madina al-Kalbi tribe.He lived in kufa. Salim helped Muslim ibn Aqil in his uprising, and after Muslim's martyrdom, was arrested by Kathir ibn Shahab. He managed to escape Obayd-Allah ibn Ziyad's prison and hide with his own tribe.

== Joining Hussain ==
After Hussain's caravan reached Karbala, Salim and a number of people from Banu Kalb joined the Hussain's army. He was martyred on the Day of Ashura. Salim was martyred during the first attack on the Day of Ashura. but, in other resource does not list Salim among the first martyrs.

Salim is mentioned as martyr of Karbala in the version of Ziyara al-Shuhada: "peace be upon Salim the servant of Banu l-Madina Kalbi". However, early Shiite sources of history and rijal do not mention Salim among martyrs of Karbala.
