= Darghama ibn Malik al-Taghlibi =

Martyr of the Battle of Karbala

Darghama ibn Malik al-Taghlibi ضَرغامه بن مالک تَغلُبی

Personal life
- Died: 10th of Muharram, 61 A.H. / 10 October, 680 AD
- Cause of death: Killed in the Battle of Karbala
- Resting place: Karbala, Iraq
- Known for: Being a companion of Ali, Hasan ibn Ali and Husayn ibn Ali

Religious life
- Religion: Islam

Darghama ibn Malik al-Taghlibi (Arabic: ضَرغامه بن مالک تَغلُبی) was one of the martyrs of Karbala.

== Lineage ==
He is known as "al-Taghlibi" because of his attribution to Banu Taghlib. Banu Taghlib was a tribe originating from Taghlib ibn Wa'il ibn Qasit.

== An the day of Ashura ==
On the day of Ashura, he injured and killed some enemies during the battle. He was martyred in the first battle on Ashura. It is said that he declaimed the following during the battle:

Prepare for Malik Dargham

The blow of a young man who defends dignified people

He hopes for a full reward from God
