= Jabala ibn Ali al-Shaybani =

Iraqi martyr

Jabala ibn Ali al-Shaybani جَبَلَة بن عَلی الشَیبانی

Personal life
- Died: 10th of Muharram, 61 A.H. / 10 October, 680 AD
- Cause of death: Killed in the Battle of Karbala
- Resting place: Karbala, Iraq
- Known for: Being a companion of Husayn ibn Ali

Religious life
- Religion: Islam

Jabala ibn Ali al-Shaybani (Arabic: جَبَلَة بن عَلی الشَیبانی) was martyred at the Battle of Karbala.

== Biography ==
Jabala ibn Ali was from the Banu Shayban tribe, a branch of Bakr ibn Wa'il. He was in Ali ibn Abi talib's army in the Battle of Siffin. He also accompanied Muslim ibn Aqil in his uprising in Kufa. Before Muslim was martyred, he escaped capture by Ubayd Allah ibn Ziyad.

== In the Battle of Karbala ==
When Husayn ibn Ali reached Karbala, Jabala joined his army. He was martyred in the first attack on the Day of Ashura.

Ziyarat al-Shuhada mentions him by name: "Peace be upon Jabala ibn 'Ali al-Shaybani"
