= Munjih ibn Sahm =

Martyr of the Battle of Karbala

Munjih ibn Sahm مُنْجِح أو منحج بن سهم

Personal life
- Died: 10th of Muharram, 61 A.H. / 10 October, 680 AD (aged 75)
- Cause of death: Killed in the Battle of Karbala
- Resting place: Karbala, Iraq
- Known for: Being a companion of Hussain ibn Ali

Religious life
- Religion: Islam

Munjih ibn Sahm (or Munhij) (Arabic: مُنْجِح أو منحج بن سهم) was among the deceased of the Battle of Karbala.

== Lineage ==
Hussain ibn Ali bought the mother of Munjih as a slave from Nufil ibn Harith ibn Abd al-Muttalib. She married another slave named Sahm who was Munjih's father. Munhij himself became a servant to al-Sajjad.

When Hussain left Medina to Mecca with his family, Munjih also left Medina with his mother.

== On the day of Ashura ==
During the first wave of attack by the enemies of Hussain ibn Ali, ten slaves of Ali ibn Abi Talib and Hussain were martyred according to Ibn Shahr Ashub. The name of Munjih's murderer was Hassan ibn Bakr al-Hanzali. The name of Munjih is specifically stated in Ziyara al-Shuhada as a martyr in the Battle of Karbala.
