= Shabib ibn Abd Allah al-Nahshali =

Shabib ibn Abd Allah al-Nahshali شَبیب بن عَبدِ الله النَّهشَلی

Personal life
- Died: 10th of Muharram, 61 A.H. / 10 October, 680 AD
- Cause of death: Killed in the Battle of Karbala
- Resting place: Karbala, Iraq
- Known for: Being a companion of Husayn ibn Ali

Religious life
- Religion: Islam

Shabib ibn Abd Allah al-Nahshali (Arabic: شَبیب بن عَبدِ الله النَّهشَلی) was killed in the Battle of Karbala.

== Lineage ==
Shabib ibn Abd Allah al-Nahshali al-Basri was born into a family from Banu Nahshal tribe, a branch of Banu Taym. He has been mentioned in some Persian sources as the slave of Harith ibn Sari' al-Hamadani who went to Karbala together with Sayf ibn al-Harith al-Hamdani and Malik ibn Abd Allah ibn Sari'. But, this is incompatible with the reports which suggest that he was with Husayn ibn Ali from Medina. However, Mamaqani believed that he was someone other than Shabib ibn Abd Allah Harith ibn Sari' al-Kufi.

Muhammad Mahdi Shams al-Din has mentioned that Habib ibn Abd Allah was one of the Martyrs of Karbala and also mentioned this probability that Shabib ibn Abd Allah al-Nahshali would be the one who has also been referred to as Habib ibn Abd Allah or Abu Amr al-Nahshali.

== Biography ==
Shabib was among the Followers of the Prophet and the companions of Ali ibn Abi Talib and participated in the battles of Jamal, Siffin and Nahrawan. After Ali was martyred, he was among the companions of al-Hasan and stayed with him. At the time of al-Husayn, he was among his companions.

== In the Battle of Karbala ==
Shabib was with Husayn on the way from Medina to Mecca and then toward Karbala. On the Day of Ashura, Shabib was martyred in the first attack of the enemy while fighting with them.

In the Ziyara al-Shuhada, he has been mentioned as, "Peace be upon Shabib ibn Abd Allah al-Nahshali."
