= Imam Husayn Shrine =

Burial site of Husayn ibn Ali in Karbala, Iraq

- مَقَام ٱلْإِمام ٱلْحُسَيْن ٱبْن عَلِيّ

- Location of the shrine in Iraq

Religion
- Affiliation: Shia Islam
- Festival: Day of Ashura
- Ecclesiastical or organisational status: Shrine
- Status: Active

Location
- Location: Karbala, Karbala Governorate
- Country: Iraq
- Interactive map of Imam Husayn Shrine
- Coordinates: 32°36′59″N 44°01′57″E

Architecture
- Type: Shi’i mosque
- Style: Islamic architecture
- Completed: 680 CE

Specifications
- Dome: Two
- Dome height (outer): 27 metres (89 ft)
- Minaret: Two (formerly 3)
- Shrines: Many including Husayn ibn Ali, Habīb ibn Madhahir al-Asadī and 72 martyrs of Karbalā'

The Imam al Husayn Shrine (Arabic: مَقَام الإِمَامُ الْحُسَيْن اِبِنْ عَلي, romanized: Maqām al-ʾImām al-Ḥusayn ʾibn ʿAlī) is the mausoleum of Husayn ibn Ali and Shi'ite mosque, located in the holy city of Karbala, in the Karbala Governorate of Iraq. Husayn was a grandson of Muhammad, and the site is near the place where he was killed during the Battle of Karbala in 680 CE. The tomb of Husayn is one of the holiest sites in Shia Islam, outside of Mecca and Medina, and many make pilgrimages to the site. Every year, millions of pilgrims visit the city to observe Ashura, which marks the commemoration of Husayn's death for all Muslims.

== Description ==
The boundary wall of the shrine surrounds wooden gates covered with glass decorations. The gates open into a courtyard separated into smaller rooms or precincts with many "iwans" along the walls. The grave of Husayn is enclosed within a metal-mesh like structure, found directly beneath the golden dome. On 5 March 2013, the process of replacing the zarih (metal mesh like structure) over the tomb of Husayn was completed and the new zarih inaugurated. The Al Abbas Mosque is located nearby. Plans to replace the shrine's historic dome with a modern steel framed one were met with controversy, especially by historic preservationists, as it would severely distort the shrine's historic integrity and character.

The first dome is 27 metres (89 ft) high and completely covered with gold. At the bottom, it is surrounded with twelve windows, each of which is about 1.25 metres (4 ft 1 in) away from the other, from the inside, and 1.30 metres (4 ft 3 in) from the outside. The shrine has an area of 59 metres (194 ft) by 75 metres (246 ft) with ten gates, and about 65 decorated rooms used for studying.

=== Burials ===
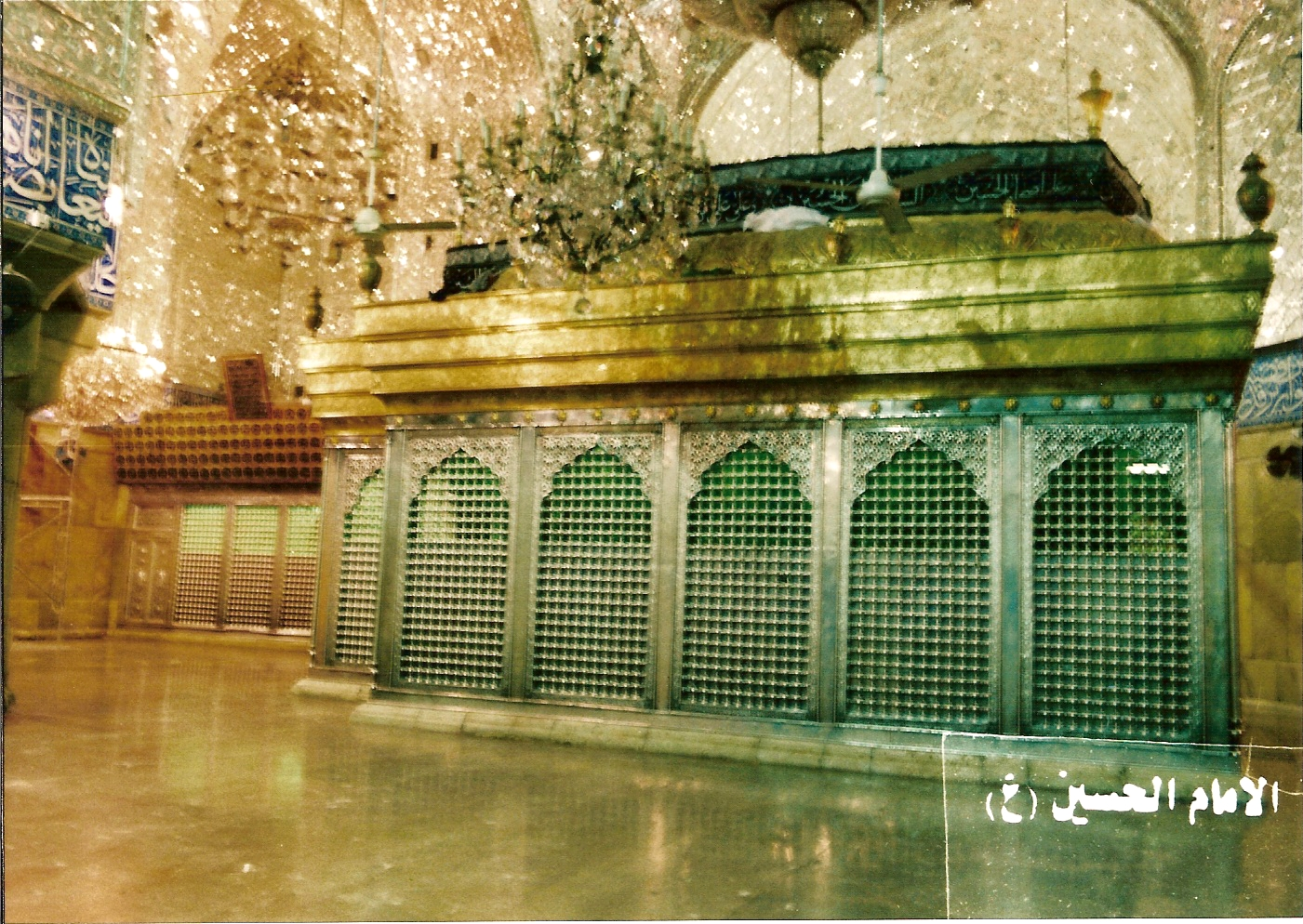
The zarih of the shrine.

The grave of Husayn ibn Ali is found in the middle of the precinct, it is called the Rawḍah ("garden") and it has several doors. The most famous one is called Al-Qiblah or Bāb al-Zah'ab. On the right hand side of the entrance is the tomb of Habīb ibn Madhahir al-Asadī (حبیب ابن مظاهر الاسدی), a friend and companion of Husayn since their childhood and a casualty of the Battle of Karbala.

Within the shrine of Husayn can also be found a grave of all the 72 martyrs of Karbalā'. They were buried in a mass grave which was then covered with soil to the ground level. This mass grave is at the foot of Husayn's grave. Beside Husayn's grave, there are also the graves of his two sons: 'Alī al-Akbar and the six-month old, 'Alī al-Asghar. Along with the graves of the martyrs of Karbala, is also the grave of the very first custodian of Imam Husayn shrine, Ibrahim al-Mujab, grandson of seventh shi'ite Imam Musa al-Kazim.

== History ==
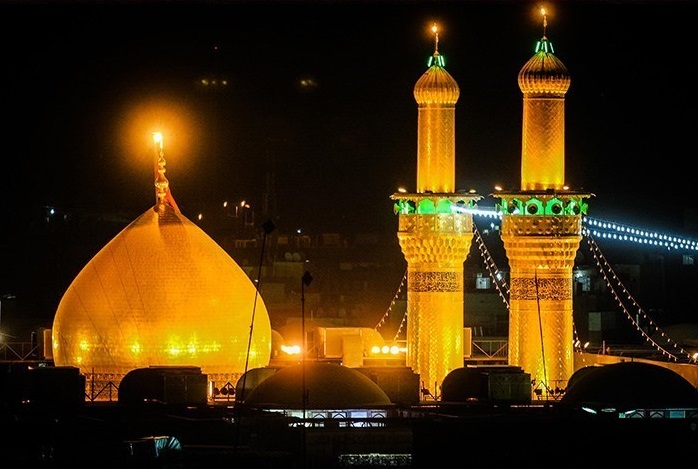
The shrine at night, in 2016

Husayn bought a piece of land after his arrival at Karbala' from Bani Asad. He and his Ahl al-Bayt are buried in that portion, known as Arabic: الحائر, romanized: al-Ḥā'ir, where the shrines are presently located. The history of destruction and reconstruction of the shrines of Karbala' is long. Both the shrines were greatly extended by successive Muslim rulers, but suffered repeated destruction from attacking armies. Several rulers extended, decorated and kept the shrines and its precincts in good condition. Among them is Fath-Ali Shah Qajar, who in 1250 AH ordered the construction of two shrines, one over Husayn's grave and the other over the grave of his half-brother, Abbas ibn Ali.

From the time of Husayn ibn Ali's death in 680, pilgrimages to commemorate the massacre have often been repressed. Despite many attempts by successive rulers, such as Al-Rashīd and Al-Mutawakkil, to put a restriction on the development of the area, it has nonetheless evolved into a city.

The historian Ibn Kuluwayh mentioned that those who buried Husayn ibn 'Alī constructed a special, durable identifying marker for the gravesite.

Larger, more significant construction on the gravesite began during the rule of al-Saffah (r. 750–754 CE), the first caliph of the long-lasting Abbasid caliphate (an Islamic dynasty). However, heavy restrictions were put in place to prevent people from visiting the grave during the rule of Hārūn al-Rashīd, the fifth Abbasid caliph (r. 786–809 CE).

During the rule of al-Mā'mūn, the seventh Abbasid caliph (r. 813–833 CE), gravesite construction resumed until the year 850 CE, when al-Mutawakkil ordered the destruction of the grave and the filling of the resulting pit with water. His son who succeeded him as caliph, al-Muntasir, allowed people to visit the gravesite, and since then, building the precinct to the grave increased and developed step by step.

On the other hand, the historian Ibn al-Athir, stated that in 371 AH (981/982 CE), 'Adhud ad-Dawlah became the first to expansively lay the foundations for large-scale construction and to generously decorate the place. He also built houses and markets around the precinct, and surrounded Karbalā with a high boundary wall, turning it into a strong castle.

In 407 AH (1016/1017 CE), the precinct caught fire due to the dropping of two large candles on the wooden decorations. The state minister at the time, Hasan ibn Fadl, rebuilt the damaged sections.

=== Timeline ===
The following events are in chronological order, stating instances that widely involved the shrine, impressing its construction, renovation and series of extremist activities that reduced its structure and killed pilgrims from time to time.

Year		Event	Notes
AH	CE	Event	Notes
61	680	10 October: Husayn is said to have been buried on this day. It was Bani Asad who, after the departure of Ahl al-Bait, assembled at the grave of Husayn. Historical accounts provide little light on the first builder of the shrine. It is assumed that Bani Asad was also the first, who erected a tent upon the grave of Husayn. A Shaikh of Bani Asad lit a candle at the grave and planted a berry tree a few feet away from the side of the head of the grave, to indicate the grave of Husayn.	
65	684	A shrine was built by Mukhtar ibn Abu 'Ubayd ath-Thaqafi on the spot and a dome was created over the grave. Over the dome he fixed a green flag. Two entrance gates were made for the shrine. He also settled several families around the enclosure.	
132	749	Another dome was erected over the shrine and additional two gates for entrance were made at the mausoleum during the reign of Abbasid Caliph As-Saffah.	
140	763	During the reign of Caliph al-Mansur, the roof along with the domes were destroyed.	
158	774	The demolished roof was rebuilt during the reign of Caliph al-Mahdi.	
171	787	During the reign of Caliph Harun ar-Rashid, the mausoleum was destroyed and the Berry tree that stood besides the grave of Husayn was cut down. Even then people kept visiting the grave of Husayn, guided by the traces of the 'Tree of the Berry', which covered the grave. Harun al-Rashid could not tolerate this, and ordered the tree to be cut off from the roots, with the intention to wipe out the sign of the grave of Husayn and stop the practice of visiting the grave.	
193	808	The mausoleum was reconstructed during the reign of Caliph al-Mamun for political advantage against Al-Amin.	
236	850	Caliph al-Mutawakkil destroyed the mausoleum and ordered the nearby land, including the grave, to be ploughed. The shrine was destroyed four times from 232 AH until 246 AH.	
247	861	Caliph al-Muntasir reconstructed the shrine with an iron pillar build a roof over the grave. Under instruction of Al Muntasir, new houses were built around the shrines.	
273	886	Once again the mausoleum was destroyed on the order of Abbasid political and military leader Talha al-Muwaffaq ibn Jafar al-Mutawakkil or by al-Muktafi bi-lah.	
280	893	The shrine was rebuilt by the Alid council and two minarets were constructed on either side of the grave. Two entrance gates for the shrine were also constructed.	
307	977	A sepulcher was constructed within the shrine using teak wood, by the Buwayhid emir 'Adhud ad-Dawlah. Surrounding galleries were also constructed. He also constructed the city of Karbala by making houses and the city boundary. 'Imrān ibn Shahin at that time also constructed a mosque adjacent to the shrine.	
407	1016	Fire destroyed the shrine. The vizier Hasan ibn Fadl rebuilt the structure.	
620	1223	The sepulcher was renovated by an-Nasir li-Din Allah.	
757	1365	The dome and walls of the shrine were reconstructed by Sultan 'Uways ibn Hasan Jalayiri. He also raised the walls of the enclosure.	
780	1384	The two minarets were reconstructed of gold by Sultan Ahmad ibn 'Uways. The courtyard was also extended.	
920	1514	The Safavid shah of Iran Ismail I, constructed a sarcophagus of inlaid glass work over the real grave.	
1032	1622	Abbas Shah Safavi renovated the sarcophagus with brass and bronze and also the dome with Kashi tiles.	
1048	1638	Sultan Murad IV whitewashed the dome.	
1155	1742	Nadir Shah Afshar decorated the shrine and offered expensive gems to the treasury of the shrine.	
1211	1796	Aghā Muhammad Shāh Qājār covered the dome with gold. He also decorated the Min'ar and gold plated it.	
1216	1801	Wahhabis under Abdulaziz bin Muhammad Al Saud attacked Karbala, damaged the shrine and looted the sepulchre.	
1232	1817	Fat'h 'Alī Shāh Qājār reconstructed the screens by plating with silver. He also replated the dome with gold and therefore repaired the damage caused by the Wahhabis.	
1283	1866	Nāsir ad-Dīn Shāh Qājār broadened the courtyard of the mausoleum.	
1358	1939	Syedna Taher Saifuddin, of the Dawoodi Bohra community presented a set of solid silver screens with gold which were attached to the shrine. This set is made of 500 gold coins (each coin consisted 12 grams weight) and 200 thousand coins of silver, beautified with precious gems.	
1360	1941	The western minaret was rebuilt by Syedna Taher Saifuddin. He spent a considerable amount gold plating all the Min'ar.	
1367	1948	A road was built around the shrine by the then administrator of Karbala City, Sayyid Abd al-Rasul al-Khalsi. He also broadened the courtyard of the shrine.	
1411	1991	Major damage to the shrine occurs as the city experiences violent reprisals by the army of Saddam Hussein after an uprising against his regime following the Persian Gulf War.	
1415	1994	Repairs to the shrine from the damage done in 1991 are completed.	
1425	2004	2 March: At least six explosions occurred during the 'Āshūrā' commemorations, killing 178 people and wounding 500.	
1425	2004	15 December: A bomb detonated near the gate of the shrine, killing at least 7 people and injuring 31 others.	
1426	2006	5 January: Suicide bombers among the crowd between the two shrines, killed at least 60 people and injured more than 100.	
1428	2007	14 April: A suicide attack 200 m (660 ft) from the shrine killed at least 36 people and injured more than 160 others.	
1428	2007	December: Construction work began on building a roof over the courtyard of the shrine, with hopes of creating a second floor and expanding the shrine.	
1429	2008	17 March: A female suicide bomber detonated herself in the market near the shrine, killed at least 42 people and injured 58 others.	
1429	2008	11 September: A bomb was detonated 800 m from the shrine, killing one woman and injuring 12 others.	
1430	2009	12 February: A bomb blast killed 8 people and wounded more than 50 others during the commemoration of Arba'een.	
1431	2010	Attacks aimed at pilgrims attending the commemoration of Arba'een: 1 February: A female suicide bomber detonated herself, killing 54 people and injuring more than 100 others.; 3 February: A bomb blast killed at least 23 people and injured more than 147.; 5 February: A double bomb-blast, or a combination of a bomb-blast and mortar attack killed at least 42 people and left 150 injured.	
1433	2012	Construction of a roof covering the courtyard around the shrine was completed, as pilgrims are increasing every year measures to enhance their experience are being taken.	
1441	2019	10 September: 31 people were killed and approximately 100 more were injured in Karbala stampede during Ashura.	

== Gallery ==
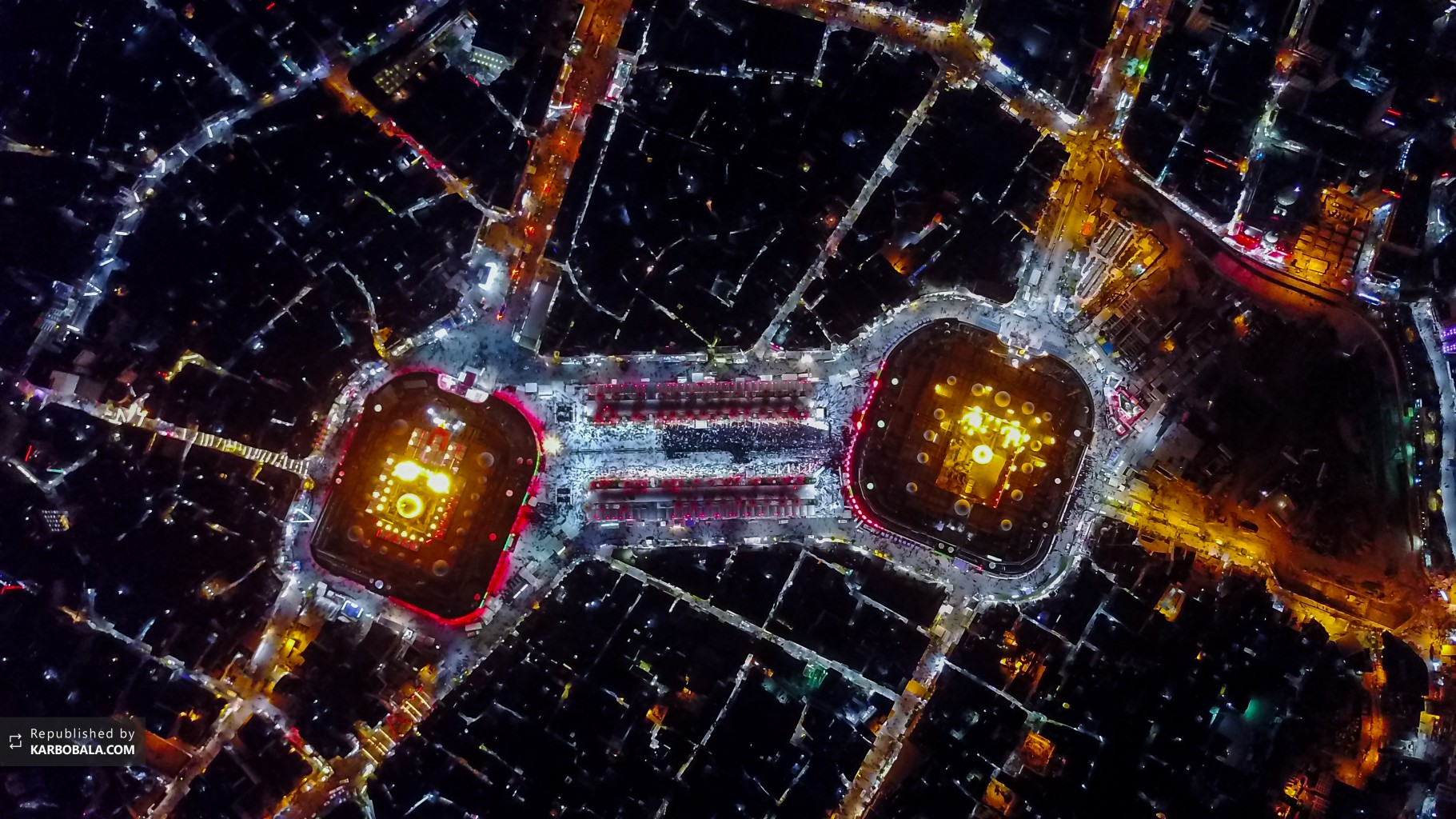
Karbala from above

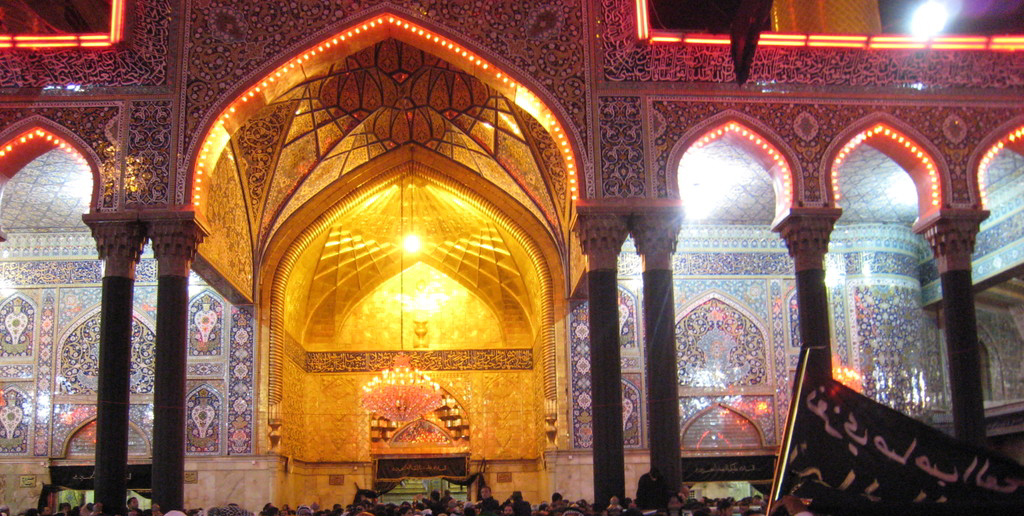
Entry gate to the grave of Husayn within the mosque

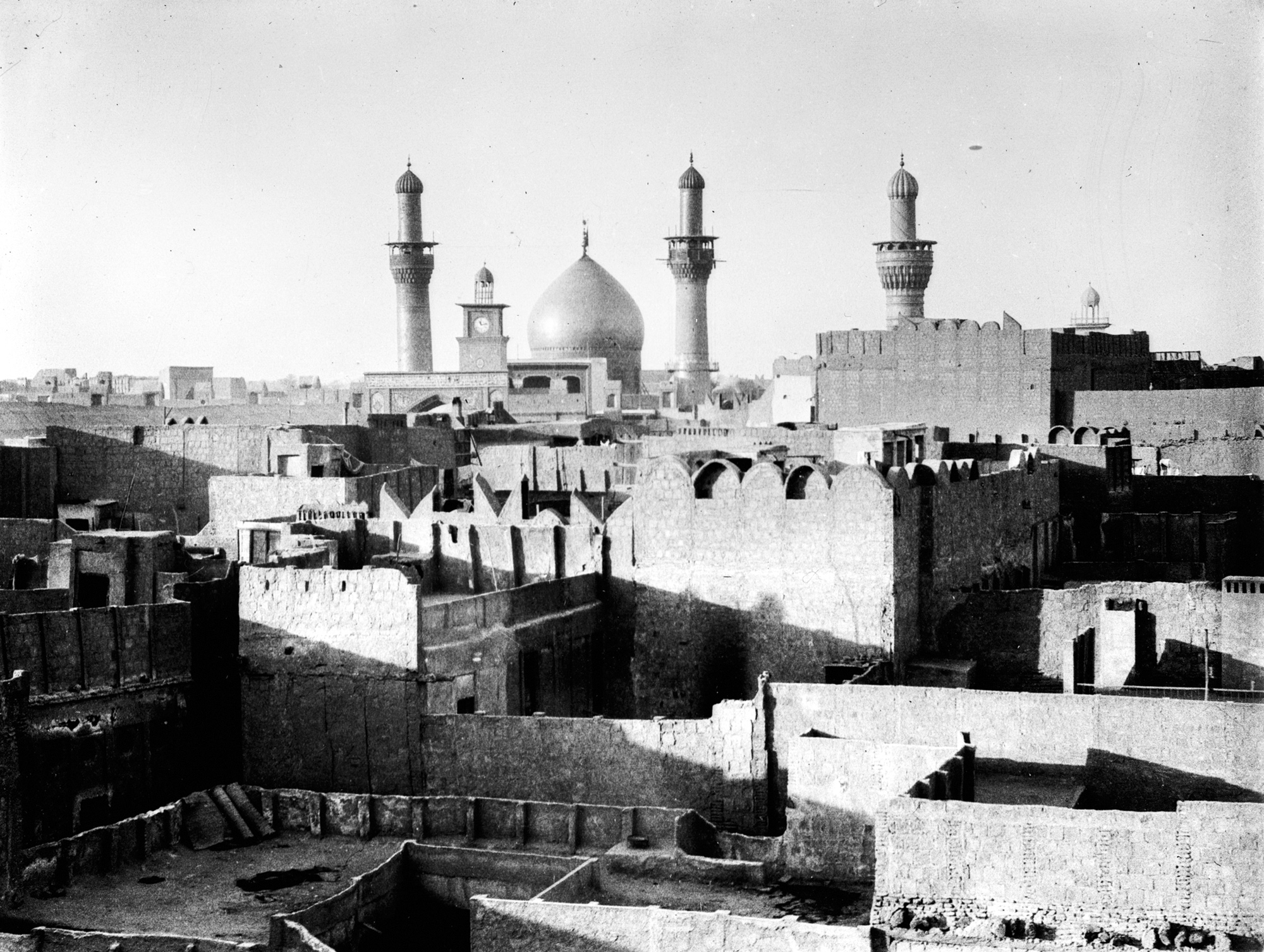
Imam Hussain shrine in 1932

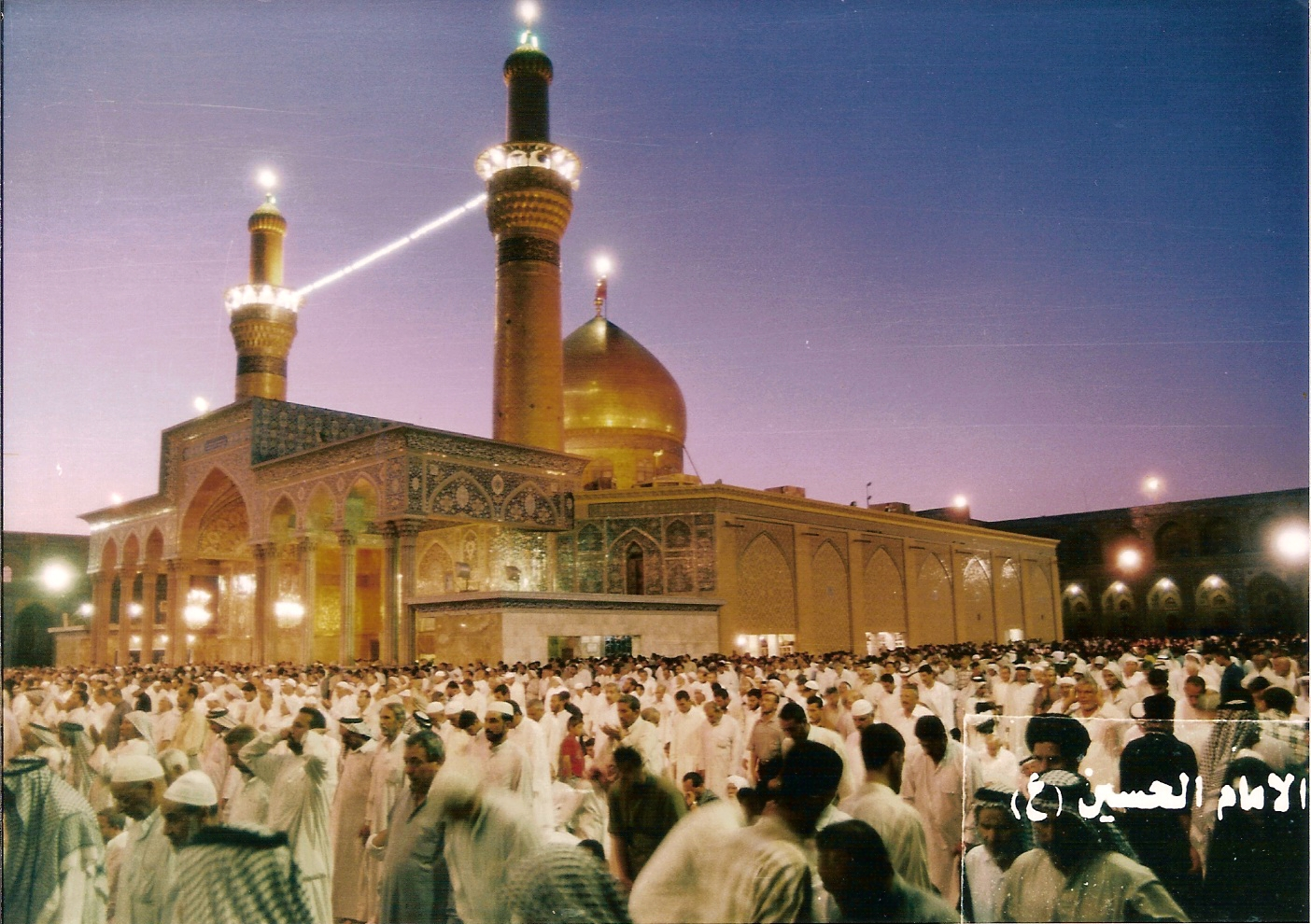
Imam Husayn shrine, before the renovations in 2008

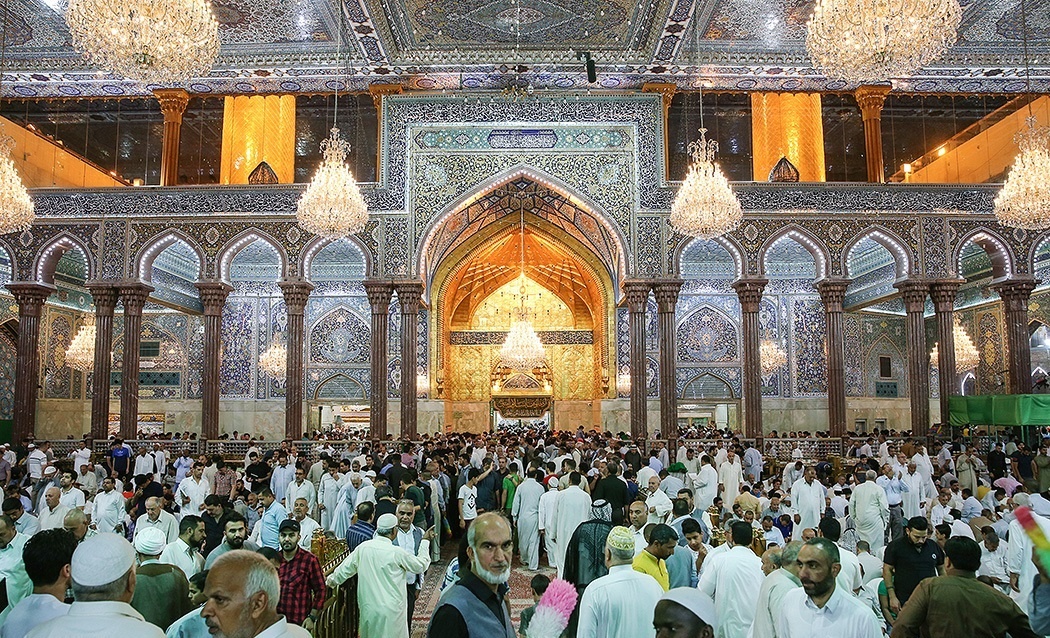
Ramadan 1439 AH, Karbala 24

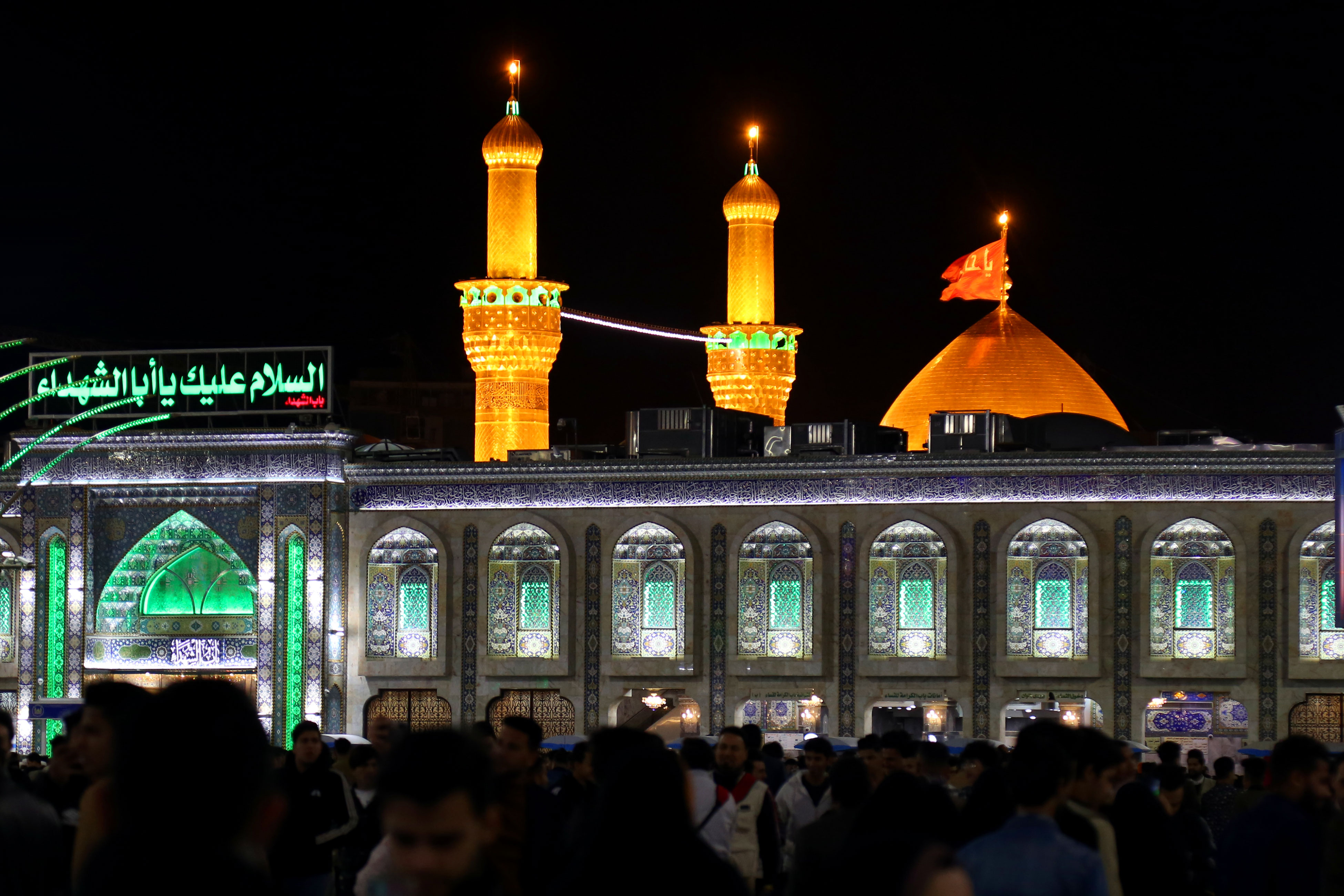
Between the holy shrines

== See also ==
- Shia Islam in Iraq
- Holiest sites in Shia Islam
- List of the oldest mosques in the world
- List of mosques in Iraq
