= Habib ibn Muzahir =

Companion of Ali

Habib ibn Muzahir حَبِيب ٱبْن مُظَاهِر

Personal life
- Born: 605
- Died: 10th of Muharram, 61 A.H. / 10 October 680
- Cause of death: Killed in the Battle of Karbala
- Resting place: Imam Husayn Shrine; 32°36′59″N 44°01′57″E
- Parent: Muẓāhir (father)
- Known for: Companion of Muhammad, Ali, Hasan ibn Ali, Husayn ibn Ali

Religious life
- Religion: Islam

Military service
- Allegiance: Husayn ibn Ali
- Battles/wars: Battle of Karbala

Habib ibn Muzahir (Arabic: حبيب بن مظاهر الأسدي, romanized: Ḥabīb ibn Muẓāhir al-Asadī) was a member of the Banu Asad clan and a companion of the Islamic prophet Muhammad, Ali, Hasan, and Husayn. He was among those in Kufa who invited Husayn to the city. When the people of Kufa broke their allegiance to Husayn, Habib left Kufa and joined Husayn. He was killed at the age of 75 during the Battle of Karbala. Habib is buried in the mausoleum of the collective grave of the martyrs of Karbala in the Imam Husayn Shrine, a profoundly holy site in Shia Islam.

== Activities in Kufa ==
After the death of Mu'awiya I (680 CE), Habib ibn Muzahir and several leaders of the Shi'a community in Kufa, including Sulayman ibn Surad, Musayyib ibn Najaba, and Rifa'a ibn Shaddad al-Bajali, reportedly refused to swear allegiance to Yazid and sent letters inviting Husayn ibn Ali to lead Kufa in opposition to the Umayyad rule.

When Muslim ibn Aqil arrived in Kufa as Husayn's representative, Habib and other supporters reportedly pledged their allegiance to him. People in Kufa reportedly also secretly pledged allegiance to Habib and Muslim ibn Awsaja as representatives of Muslim ibn Aqil.

After Ubayd Allah ibn Ziyad took control of Kufa, he reportedly threatened the population and cracked down on supporters of Muslim ibn Aqil, causing many to abandon their allegiance. To avoid persecution, Habib and Muslim ibn Awsaja were reportedly hidden by the Banu Asad tribe. They eventually left Kufa, traveling at night and hiding during the day, and joined Husayn ibn Ali's camp in Karbala on 7 Muharram 61 AH (October 7, 680 CE).

== Battle of Karbala ==
Habib commanded the left flank of Husayn's army, which was divided into three sections: left, right, and center. His tomb is located in the Imam Husayn Shrine on the southern porch.

He reportedly killed 62 enemy soldiers before being struck on the head by Budayl bin Maryam 'Aqfani. Another soldier stabbed him with a spear, causing him to fall from his horse, after which Budayl beheaded him.

== Tomb ==
After the Battle of Karbala, the Banu Asad tribe, who were responsible for burying the martyrs, reportedly buried Habib ibn Muzahir separately, at a distance of approximately 10 meters from the tomb of Husayn ibn Ali. As one of the elders and respected figures of the Banu Asad, his grave was treated with particular care.

Over time, the area containing Habib's tomb became incorporated into the Imam Husayn Shrine, and it is now located on the southern porch of the shrine. His tomb remains a site of visitation and remembrance for pilgrims and devotees.

== See also ==
- Husayn ibn Ali
- Battle of Karbala
- Zuhayr ibn al-Qayn
- Shia Muslims
- Banu Asad (tribe)
- Burayr ibn Khudayr al-Hamdani
