= Qarib ibn Abd Allah =

Qarib ibn Abd Allah قارب بن عبدالله

Personal life
- Died: 10th of Muharram, 61 A.H. / 10 October, 680 AD (aged 75)
- Cause of death: Killed in the Battle of Karbala
- Resting place: Karbala, Iraq
- Known for: Being a companion of Hussain ibn Ali

Religious life
- Religion: Islam

Qarib ibn Abd Allah (Arabic: قارب بن عبدالله) known as Qarib Mawla al-Hussain, was killed in the Battle of Karbala.

== Lineage ==
"Fakiha", Qarib's mother was Hussain ibn Ali's maid who worked in the house of Rabab, the wife of Hussain. Hussain ibn Ali asked her to marry Abd Allah Urayqit and after marriage, she gave birth to Qarib; therefore, Qarib was considered Hussain ibn Ali's servant. Qarib's father, "Abd Allah b. Urayqit" was the Prophet's guide in immigration to Medina.

Fakiha was also present in the event of Karbala and was among the Captives of Karbala.

== In the Battle of Karbala ==
When Hussain declined to offer allegiance (baya) to Yazid, he decided to left Medina. In Imam's journey from Medina to Mecca and from there to Karbala, Qarib accompanied him. It is said that he was killed in the first attack of the enemy, before the noon of Ashura.

In the Ziyarah al-shuhada, it is mentioned: "Peace be upon Qarib, servant of Hussain b. Ali".
