= Amir ibn Muslim al-Abdi =

Shia martyr

Amir ibn Muslim al-Abdi عامِر بن مُسلِم العَبدی

Personal life
- Died: 10th of Muharram, 61 A.H. / 10 October, 680 AD (aged 75)
- Cause of death: Killed in the Battle of Karbala
- Resting place: Karbala, Iraq
- Known for: Being a companion of Ali ibn Abi Talib, Hassan ibn Ali and Hussain ibn Ali

Religious life
- Religion: Islam

Amir ibn Muslim al-Abdi (Arabic: عامِر بن مُسلِم العَبدی) was a companions of Hussain ibn Ali and was martyred in the Battle of Karbala. His name was included among those who were martyred in the first raid.

== Lineage ==
Amir was son of Muslim from the families of Abd al-Qays. According to Mamaqani, Muslim was martyred in the army of Ali ibn Abi Talib in the Battle of Siffin.

== On the day of Ashura ==
Amir was from Basra who joined Hussain ibn Ali in Mecca together with his servant Salim. On the Day of Ashura, he was martyred in the first attack. His name has been mentioned in the Ziarat al-Shuhada and Ziarat Rajabiyya.
