= Shimr =

7th-century Arab military commander

Shimr ibn Dhi al-Jawshan
- Arabic: شمر بن ذي الجوشن, romanized: Shimr ibn Dhī al-Jawshan
- Died: Around 685; Probably Kufa
- Relatives: Banu Kilab,
- Military career
- Allegiance: Rashidun Caliphate (657); Umayyad Caliphate (680)
- Branch: Rashidun army
- Service years: 657, 680
- Conflicts: First Fitna; Battle of Siffin (657); Second Fitna; Battle of Karbala (680)

Abū al-Sābigha Shamir ibn Dhī al-Jawshan (Arabic: أبو السابغة شمر بن ذي الجوشن), often known as Shamir or Shimar, was an Arab military commander from Kufa who killed Husayn ibn Ali, the grandson of the Islamic prophet Muhammad, at the Battle of Karbala in 680.

== Life ==
Shimr was a son of Shurahbil (or Aws) Dhi al-Jawshan ibn Qurt al-A'war ibn Amr, a companion of the Islamic prophet Muhammad, who settled in Kufa after the Muslim conquest of Iraq. He was from the Mu'awiya al-Dibab clan of the Banu Kilab, branch of the Qaysid tribe of the Hawazinite Banu Amir. Shimr was an ally of the 4th Rashidun Caliphate Ali (r. 656–661) and fought against Mu'awiya, the governor of Syria and future founder of the Umayyad Caliphate, at the Battle of Siffin, where he received a head wound. He later defected to the Umayyads. When Ziyad ibn Abihi arrested the pro-Alid Hujr ibn Adi on the charge of treason in 671, Shimr was among those who testified against Hujr.

In 680, Husayn ibn Ali, a grandson of Muhammad and son of caliph Ali, sent his cousin Muslim ibn Aqil to Kufa in response to calls from the pro-Alids to overthrow the Umayyads. Shimr, along with various other tribal notables, aided the governor Ubayd Allah ibn Ziyad in quelling the rebellion. Shortly afterwards, Husayn arrived in Iraq and was intercepted in the desert of Karbala outside of Kufa. After Ibn Ziyad consented to a peace proposal from Husayn, Shimr reportedly opposed the proposal and convinced Ibn Ziyad to subdue Husayn with force. Shimr was subsequently sent to Karbala with orders to either force Husayn into submission or to kill him in case of refusal. A day before the battle, Shimr offered safe conduct to three paternal brothers of Husayn, including Abbas ibn Ali, whose mother, Umm al-Banin, was from the tribe of Shimr. The offer was declined because Husayn was not offered any safe conduct. On the battle day (10 October), Shimr commanded the left wing of the Umayyad army. Upon the orders of the commander of the army, Umar ibn Sa'd, Shimr set on fire the tents of Husayn's companions, and was intent on burning Husayn's personal tent before being prevented by his own comrades.

After a day of conflict, Husayn suffered many casualties, but the Umayyad soldiers hesitated to kill Husayn. Shimr encouraged them to kill him: "Shame on you! Why are you waiting for the man? Kill him, may your mothers be deprived of you!" Shimr then led the final assault. Some accounts name him as the one who ultimately killed and decapitated Husayn, while other accounts name Sinan ibn Anas. He then attempted to kill Husayn's surviving son Zayn al-Abidin, but was prevented by Ibn Sa'd. Afterwards, Shimr led the escort carrying the heads of the dead to Kufa. Later he accompanied the prisoners to Syria. He is reported to have regretted his actions later in his life.

During the rule of Mukhtar al-Thaqafi, who had seized Kufa in October 685, Shimr was among the agitators who attempted to topple Mukhtar. After the rebellion was defeated, Shimr escaped to Sadama, a place between Kufa and Basra. Mus'ab ibn al-Zubayr ruled Basra at the time and Shimr wrote him a letter requesting assistance. The letter was intercepted by Mukhtar's soldiers led by Abu Amra Kaysan. With his location thus exposed, Shimr was found and killed. Other variants suggest that he was wounded and sent to Mukhtar, who then killed him.

== Descendants ==
After Shimr was killed his sons left Kufa for the Jazira. Shimr's grandson al-Sumayl ibn Hatim was a commander in the Umayyad army of Balj ibn Bishr sent against the Berber Revolt in North Africa in 742 and became a leader of the Kilab troops settled in al-Andalus thereafter.

== Depiction ==
Shimr is depicted usually wearing red with a long feathered cap in the passion plays during the Shia mourning remembrance of Ashura.

== Sources ==
- Burke, Edmund; Yaghoubian, Nejde (2006). Struggle and Survival in the Modern Middle East. University of California Press. ISBN 9780520246614.
- Caskel, Werner (1966). Ğamharat an-nasab: Das genealogische Werk des His̆ām ibn Muḥammad al-Kalbī, Volume II (in German). Leiden: Brill.
- Hawting, G. R., ed. (1996). The History of al-Ṭabarī, Volume XVII: The First Civil War: From the Battle of Siffīn to the Death of ʿAlī, A.D. 656–661/A.H. 36–40. SUNY Series in Near Eastern Studies. Albany, New York: State University of New York Press. ISBN 978-0-7914-2393-6.
- Howard, I. K. A., ed. (1990). The History of al-Ṭabarī, Volume XIX: The Caliphate of Yazīd ibn Muʿāwiyah, A.D. 680–683/A.H. 60–64. SUNY Series in Near Eastern Studies. Albany, New York: State University of New York Press. ISBN 978-0-7914-0040-1.
- Kohlberg, Etan (2004). "Shamir b. Dhi'l-Djawshan". In Bearman, P. J.; Bianquis, Th.; Bosworth, C. E.; van Donzel, E. & Heinrichs, W. P. (eds.). The Encyclopaedia of Islam, Second Edition. Volume XII: Supplement. Leiden: E. J. Brill. pp. 722–723. ISBN 978-90-04-13974-9.
- Rowson, Everett K., ed. (1989). The History of al-Ṭabarī, Volume XXII: The Marwānid Restoration: The Caliphate of ʿAbd al-Malik, A.D. 693–701/A.H. 74–81. SUNY Series in Near Eastern Studies. Albany, New York: State University of New York Press. ISBN 978-0-88706-975-8.
- James, David (2012). A History of Early Al-Andalus: The Akhbar Majmu'a. Abingdon, Oxon: Routledge. ISBN 978-0-415-66943-6.
- Taha, Abdulwahid Dhanun (2016) [1989]. The Muslim Conquest and Settlement of North Africa and Spain. Abingdon, Oxon: Routledge. ISBN 978-1-138-68963-3.
- Vaglieri, L. Veccia (1971). "(Al)-Ḥusayn b. 'Alï b. Abï Ṭālib". In Lewis, B.; Ménage, V. L.; Pellat, Ch. & Schacht, J. (eds.). The Encyclopaedia of Islam, Second Edition. Volume III: H–Iram. Leiden: E. J. Brill. pp. 607–615. OCLC 495469525.
