= Hanzala ibn As'ad al-Shibami =

Hanzala b. As'ad al-Shibami حَنْظَلَة بن أسعَد الشِبامی

Personal life
- Died: 10th of Muharram, 61 A.H. / 10 October, 680 AD
- Cause of death: Killed in the Battle of Karbala
- Resting place: Karbala, Iraq
- Known for: Being a companion of Husayn ibn Ali

Religious life
- Religion: Islam

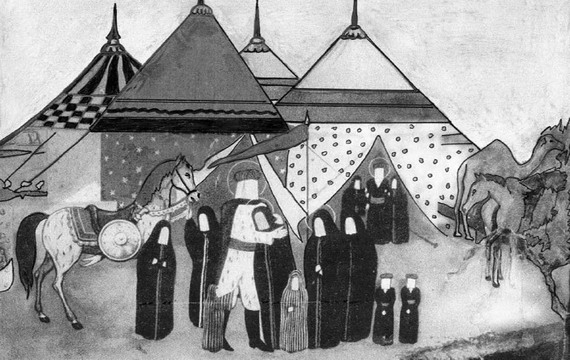
Husayn ibn ‘Alī ibn Abī Tālib bidding farewell to his family before marching to Karbalā’

Hanzala b. As'ad al-Shibami (Arabic: حَنْظَلَة بن أسعَد الشِبامی) or al-Shami (الشامی) was among companions of Husayn ibn Ali who died during the Battle of Karbala.

== Disagreement over his Name ==
His name was mentioned in sources with some variations. In the list of Husayn ibn Ali's companions, Al-Shaykh al-Tusi mentions him as Hanzala ibn As'ad al-Shibami. In other texts, however, the name of his father is mentioned as Sa'd. Ibn Shahrashub mentions a person called "Sa'd ibn Hanzala" as a Martyrs of Karbala. However, al-Tustari believes that his name is Hanzala ibn As'ad al-Shibami.

== On the day of Ashura ==
Hanzala asked Husayn ibn Ali's permission to recite the Quran 40:30-33 to the army of Kufa: "O my people! Indeed I fear for you [a day] like the day of the [heathen] factions; like the case of the people of Noah, of ʿAd and Thamud, and those who were after them, and Allah does not desire any wrong for [His] servants. O my people! I fear for you a day of mutual distress calls, a day when you will turn back [to flee], not having anyone to protect you from Allah, and whomever Allah leads astray has no guide."

He then said: "O people! do not kill Husayn; you will be destroyed with a divine punishment, and whoever tells lies will be disappointed."

Then Husayn said: "O Ibn Sa'd! May God bless you. They deserved the punishment when they rejected your call and attacked you to shed your blood and the blood of your friends, let alone now that they have martyred your pious friends."

Then Hanzala said: "May I be thy ransom! You are right. You are more knowledgeable than me with respect to religion and you understand it better. Let us go to the afterlife and join our brothers… God's blessings be upon you, O Aba 'Abd Allah, and your pure household. May God make me your companion in the Heaven."

While Husayn was saying "Amin", Hanzala went to the battlefield, and was martyred on the Day of Ashura 61/680 after killing some people from the army of Kufa.
