= Abu al-Hutuf ibn al-Harth al-Ansari =

Abu al-Hutuf ibn al-Harth al-Ansari أبوالحتوف بن حَرث (الحارث) الأنصاری

Personal life
- Died: 10th of Muharram, 61 A.H. / 10 October, 680 AD
- Cause of death: Killed in the Battle of Karbala
- Resting place: Karbala, Iraq
- Known for: Being a companion of Husayn ibn Ali

Religious life
- Religion: Islam

Abu al-Hutuf ibn al-Harth al-Ansari (Arabic: أبوالحتوف بن حَرث (الحارث) الأنصاری) was martyred in the Battle of Karbala.

== Lineage ==
He was also known as Abu al-Hutuf Salama ibn al-Harth al-Ansari al-'Ajlani and his father's name was al-Harth ibn Salama al-Ansari al-Ajlani. Abu al-Hutuf was from Kufa, from the Banu 'Ajlan clan, one of the Khawarij in Kufa, and from the Khazraj tribe in Medina who were from Ansar.

== Joining Husayn ibn Ali ==
Abu al-Hutuf and his brother, Sa'd ibn al-Harth were part of Umar ibn Sa'd's army that was fighting Husayn. On the Day of Ashura when all of the Husayn's companions were martyred except two of them, Suwayd ibn 'Amr ibn Abi Muta' and Bashir ibn 'Amr al-Hadrami, the Husayn asked for help. When Abu al-Hutuf and his brother, Sa'd, heard the Husayn's call and the cry of women and children from the Prophet Muhammad's household, they said: "There is no verdict except by God and we do not obey the one who committed sins; this is Husayn, the son of the daughter of our Prophet Muhammad. How can we fight him while he has no soldiers, while we hope for his grandfather's intercession on the Day of Judgment?" At this point, the drew their swords and switched sides to Husayn's army. After killing three people and injuring a number of others, they were both martyred in one place.
