= Yazid ibn Thubayt al-Abdi al-Basri =

Yazid ibn Thubayt al-Abdi al-Basri یَزید بن ثُبَیط العَبدی البَصری

Personal life
- Died: 10th of Muharram, 61 A.H. / 10 October, 680 AD (aged 75)
- Cause of death: Killed in the Battle of Karbala
- Resting place: Karbala, Iraq
- Known for: Being a companion of Hussain ibn Ali

Religious life
- Religion: Islam

Yazid ibn Thubayt al-Abdi al-Basri (Arabic: یَزید بن ثُبَیط العَبدی البَصری) was among Hussain ibn Ali's companions who was martyred in the battle of Karbala.

== Lineage ==
Yazid ibn Thubayt was from the Abd al-Qays tribe in Basra.

== Joining Hussain ibn Ali ==
As Hussain ibn Ali's letter reached Basra calling on people to help him, Yazid decided to join Hussain's caravan. He announced, in a meeting in Mariya bint Munqidh's house where a number of Basra's Shi'as gathered. He had ten sons but only two of them, Abd Allah and Ubayd Allah, participated in the battle of Karbala. Amir ibn Muslim al-Abdi and his servant, Salim, Sayf ibn Malik al-Abdi and Adham ibn Umayya al-Abdi also joined him. They met Hussain's caravan in Abtah near Mecca and set up their tent there. when Hussain ibn Ali heard about Yazid ibn Thubayt's arrival, he went to Yazid's tent to meet him but Yazid went to see hussain. Hussain stayed in Yazid's tent and waited for him to return. When Yazid arrived in the hussain's tent, he was told that the Hussain had left to meet him. When he returned to his tent and saw Hussain, he recited the verse, "In the Bounty of Allah and His Mercy let them rejoice". He then greeted Hussain ibn Ali and then told him about what had happened. Hussain prayed for him and then they joined the Hussain's caravan.

== On the day of Ashura ==
Yazid and his two sons were martyred on the Day of Ashura. He and his sons are mentioned in Ziarat al-Shuhada: "Peace be upon Zayd ibn Thubayt al-Qaysi; peace be upon Abd Allah and Ubayd Allah, the two sons of Yazid ibn Thubayt al-Qaysi".
