= Al-Hurr ibn Yazid al-Tamimi =

7th-century Umayyad general

Al-Hurr ibn Yazid حر بن یزید
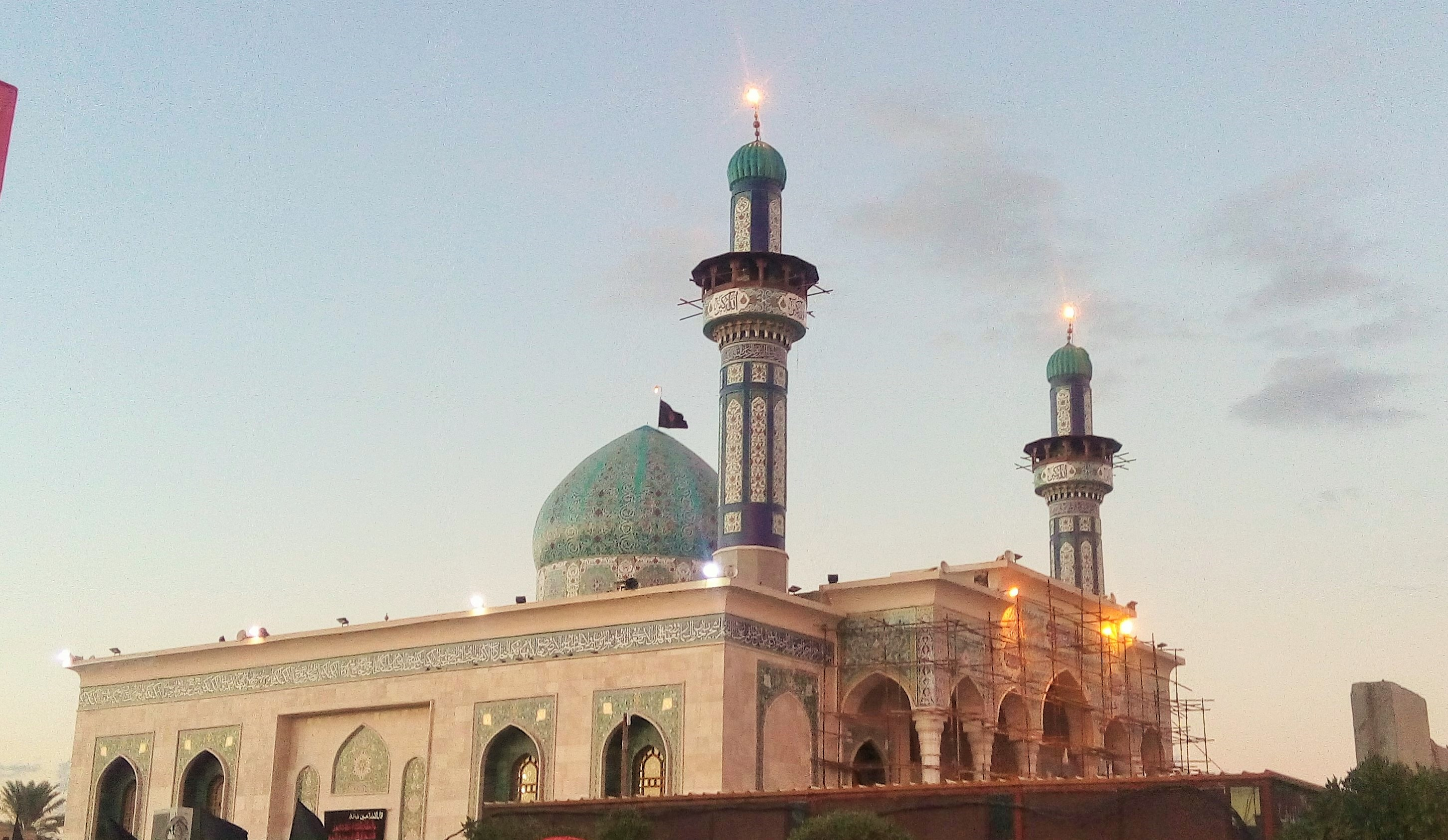
- Shrine of Al-Hurr
- Died: Muharram 10, 61 AH; Karbala, Umayyad Caliphate (now in Iraq)
- Father: Yazid ibn Najiya al-Tamimi

Al-Hurr ibn Yazid ibn Najiya al-Tamimi al-Yarbuʿi al-Riyahi (Arabic: حر بن یزید بن الناجیة التمیمي الیربوعي الریاحي) was the general of the Umayyad army dispatched from Kufa, Iraq to intercept al-Husayn ibn Ali ibn Abu Talib. The newly appointed governor of Kufa, Ubayd Allah ibn Ziyad, issued the command to guard all entrances and exits to Kufa in order to intercept al-Husayn for an oath of allegiance to Yazid ibn Mu'awiya ibn Abu Sufyan of the Umayyad dynasty. Al-Hurr ibn Yazid al-Tamimi al-Yarbu'i was to guard one of the roads with his 1,000 soldiers to sanction al-Husayn and his followers and bring them to Ibn Ziyad. Initially responsible for holding al-Husayn and his followers captive, al-Hurr died fighting on al-Husayn's behalf after decisions fueled by corrupt intentions surfaced from Ubayd Allah ibn Ziyad. Al-Hurr's short but provocative mark on history spans less than one week's time, but is embedded with complex details and fatal turns of events that led to the martyrdom of al-Husayn during the Battle of Karbala.

== Lineage and background ==
Minor discrepancies of al-Hurr's tribal lineage appear in various historical accounts. The Encyclopaedia of Islam gives his full title as "al-Hurr ibn Yazid ibn Nadjiya ibn Ka'nab ibn Attab ibn al-Harith ibn Amr ibn Hamman al Riyahi al Yarbu'i al Tamimi". In one account from al-Tabari, Zakariyya ibn Yaha al Darir describes al-Hurr as a descendant of Al-Yarbu'i Riyahi from the tribe of Banu Tamim located in Kufa, Iraq. This is the most commonly accepted lineage of al-Hurr conveying a condensed title of al-Hurr ibn Yazid al Tamimi. However, another account of al-Tabari transmitted by al-Husayn ibn Abd al-Rahman conveys the title of al-Hurr ibn Yazid al-Hanzali, deriving lineage a different clan, the Banu Nahshal.

== Encounter with Al-Husayn ==
Al-Hurr's initial orders from Ubayd Allah ibn Ziyad were not to fight or attack al-Husayn. Al-Hurr was ordered to meet and follow al-Husayn and his followers into Kufa, and not leave them to go elsewhere. An initial noncombatant encounter with Al-Husayn was stressed in many sources. Patrolling caravans within the vicinity of Kufa, al-Hurr encountered al-Husayn midday at Dhu Husam in the Iraqi desert. Al-Husayn and his followers included 32 horseman and 40 foot soldiers. According to multiple sources, female family members were present but their numbers were not included in the foot soldier count. Contrary to immediate warfare, al-Husayn greeted al-Hurr and the soldiers by personally serving them water from his own limited supply. No immediate animosity was present between al-Husayn and the opposing camp as they obliged. The hospitality of al-Husayn even extended to the cavalry of al-Hurr's troop. Al-Husayn's dwindling supply of water will be crucial to further events; his display of warrior virtue will stand in stark contrast to later treatment from the Umayyad army.

Numerous exchanges between al-Hurr and al-Husayn during this juncture lead to believe that the general Umayyad populace (in the microcosm of al-Hurr and his cavalry) was not averse to al-Husayn and his leadership. In fact, al-Husayn offered al-Hurr to lead the congregated party for prayer. Al-Hurr denied this request, and instead had al-Husayn lead prayer as imam for himself and his soldiers. Recognizing that an Umayyad army of 1,000 horsemen praying behind Yazid ibn Mu'awaiya's rival is a testament to the respect and honor still given to the family of Muhammad. This will later change with increasing commands from the Kufan governor, Ubayd Allah ibn Ziyad.

Imam Husayn not only gave Al-Hurr and his companions water from his limited supply, but also gave his horse.

== Miscommunication of letters ==
Al Husayn quickly conveyed his disposition shortly after prayer. He asserted that his arrival to Iraq was only due an abundance of written pledges of support from the people of Kufa. However, al-Husayn pleaded that if people are averse to his arrival, he would return to Mecca peacefully. Al-Hurr replies that he is unaware of any letters of allegiance approved by the Kufan people. He was not amongst those who wrote them.

Al-Hurr's response illuminates potential discrepancies within recorded history. Al-Hurr may have chosen the less controversial answer in reply to Al-Husayn, thereby eliminated an ethical decision at the scene. Also, supporters of al-Husayn may have been overestimated. Although al-Husayn had sent his cousin, Muslim ibn Aqil, to investigate the situation in Kufa, numerous sources describe inconsistent numbers of pledges of allegiance that Muslim ibn Aqil counted for al-Husayn personally. On the other hand, if al-Hurr was patrolling the desert during Muslim ibn Aqil's visit, there is reason to believe al-Hurr was simply absent from the events of Ubayd Allah ibn Ziyad's atrocities including the threat of annihilation to any supporters of al-Husayn. The latter is more likely than to encroach upon the character of al-Hurr when he has visibly demonstrated good will towards al-Husayn by accepting his hospitality and position of prayer. At this point, al-Hurr is likely unaware of any deceit on behalf of the governor Ubayd Allah ibn Ziyad. Al-Hurr may be merely administrating orders on with the intent of soldier chivalry towards al-Husayn.

== Compromise of orders ==
After the afternoon prayer on the same day, al-Husayn calls his followers to prepare for departure. Al-Hurr swiftly prevents al-Husayn from retracting his steps towards Mecca. This incurs al-Husayn to deliver a speech entailing all present to fear God, recognize the rights of all people upon each other, the rights of Muhammad's family. He also mentions that if neither al-Hurr nor his soldiers understand these rights, he simply desires to leave in peace. Al-Hurr halts and reconsiders his stance.

Hints of indecisiveness begin to accumulate for al-Hurr. He was not aware of the allegiance of the Kufan people to al-Husayn; now he may question why the rights of Muhammad's family were not emphasized more by Ubayd Allah ibn Ziyad. Another discrepancy within historical accounts occurs here. The minority account conveys that al-Hurr began to fear al-Husayn and the outcome of his deeds of captivity. This fear pushes al-Hurr to follow al-Husayn on an alternative path, neither towards Kufa or Medina, in this account.

Nevertheless, the overwhelming accounts by numerous sources convey that al-Hurr fashions a compromise. This very deed could be deemed direct treason by the Umayyad army. However, the fact that the rest of the soldiers complied to al-Hurr's position boldly prove that the ethical qualm of detaining al-Husayn may be eternally eclipsed by Ubayd Allah ibn Ziyad's conceited demands.

Al-Hurr offers al-Husayn the compromise of taking any road leading away from Kufa but not any closer to Medina. Additionally, al-Hurr writes to Ubayd Allah ibn Ziyad about the affairs and due actions of al-Husayn, and encourages al-Husayn to do the same for Yazid ibn Mu’awaiya. Moreover, al-Hurr expresses to be relieved from this entire affair of al-Husayn. This shows an emerging conscience and questioning of dispatched demands. Complying quickly, al-Husayn begins to lead his followers towards al-Udhayb, Iraq while al-Hurr follows closely with his 1,000 horsemen.

An analysis for this particular escorting move may be broad. Historians can surmise that al-Hurr may have tried to keep the impression of the offensive with al-Husayn in order to keep compliance with the Umayyad army. Al-Hurr's compromise could also be seen as stalling in order to investigate al-Husayn's claims further or the validity of Ubayd Allah ibn Ziyad's commands. Though al-Hurr wants to avoid a painful ordeal, he notably issues al-Husayn a warning. If battle does ensue, al-Husayn may be killed. The reply of al-Husayn merely asserts fearlessness. Death of those in the path of righteousness have nothing to fear, is the condensed reply of al-Husayn.

== News from Kufa ==
During day two or day three with al-Hurr's company, Kufan civilians approach al-Husayn with news from Kufa. Immediately, al-Hurr made arrangements to detain these Kufans or send them back. However, al-Husayn extended his protection to the civilians under the compromised issued by al-Hurr himself. These dedicated supporters of al-Husayn convey news of the city's betrayal and Ubayd Allah's transgressions. Al-Husayn's cousin, Muslim ibn Aqil, had been initially successful in building amicable relations for al-Husayn with the Kufan people. However, in order to exterminate any opposition to the next Umayyad caliph, Yazid I ibn Mu’awiya, this caliph appointed Ubayd Allah ibn Ziyad as the new Kufan governor to quell rising rebellion. Thus under the threat of bloodshed and violence from the Umayyad dynasty, the Kufans lapsed. Moreover, Ubayd Allah ibn Ziyad ordered Muslim ibn Aqil to be violently killed shortly after.

This raises the desperation of al-Husayn's situation even further. The truth of Kufan desertion and failed allegiance is now a reality. Historical accounts are unclear whether al-Hurr realized the impending outcome of Ubayd Allah ibn Ziyad's orders of execution. Without any room for lingering hesitation, al-Hurr responded immediately to al-Husayn's attempt to escape the army the following morning.

In the marginal period after al-Husayn's escape attempt, Ubayd Allah reply to al-Hurr's earlier letter is brought by messenger. Ubayd Allah orders al-Hurr to halt Husayn in a barren region far from a populated village or immediate water source. Moreover, the governor commands al-Hurr to execute his orders under the observance of the sent messenger. Al-Hurr immediately compels al-Husayn and his followers to stop and pitch camp. Al-Husayn objects to the vulnerable location, deprived of water or natural fortification. Al-Hurr may have recognized this lapse in basic warrior virtue, but replied to al-Husayn that the orders must be obeyed. If Ubayd Allah's issued orders were not obeyed, the messenger, also sent as a spy, may have taken alternative measures to tighten the situation. This location of captivity has two names in historical accounts. Less popular is the place of al-Taft, recognized to be near the Euphrates river. The most widely recognized name of al-Husayn's stopping point is Karbala, which is defined in Iraq as a place of sorrow. Camp at Karbala was made on the 2nd day of Muharram 61 A.H./680 A.D.

== Failed negotiation ==
Meanwhile, Ubayd Allah ibn Ziyad dispatches another force of 4,000 Umayyad soldiers with commander Umar ibn Sa’d ibn Abi Waqqas. This commander was initially reluctant to launch violence upon al-Husayn, but when threatened with loss of position, Umar ibn Sa’d complied. Al-Hurr is now under the leadership of Umar ibn Sa’d. Numerous events occurring after the arrival of new troops affect al-Hurr's future change of alliance. First, Umar ibn Sa’d meets with al-Husayn to understand his intentions and goals. At this point, al-Tabari reports that al-Husayn offers multiple proposals, which are later rejected by the governor 'Ubayd Allah: to return to Medina, or be allowed to move to another region. The governor refuses all negotiations with Al-Husayn without the compliance of an additional clause: al-Husayn must pledge allegiance to the governor of Kufa himself. If not, wage war. Al-Husayn was not willing to pledge to the murderer of Muslim ibn Aqil and the rest of the governor's treachery. However, other reports in al-Tabari's account, as well as the analysis of I. K. A. Howard, assert that while al-Husayn did request to leave the area, he did not suggest pledging an oath to Yazid. In either case, messengers were exchanged between parties, and al-Husayn was at an impasse.

Al-Hurr evaluates the situation and sought Umar ibn Sa’d's verbal affirmation of war. Inquiring if there was any other way was possible to prevent violence on al-Husayn and his people, al-Hurr wanted to confirm final actions and their intentions. Umar ibn Sa’d replied that they were going to fight al-Husayn because governor ibn Ziyad would not accept anything short of total submission. Battle preparations had begun.

== Changed alliance ==
Immediately after Umar ibn Sa'd's verdict to wage battle, al-Hurr approaches al-Husayn with 30 of his horsemen. He expresses his major transgressions to al-Husayn by preventing access back to Medina, and compelling them to halt at Karbala. Al-Hurr did not imagine the Umayyad leaders to refuse al-Husayn's proposals and conclude with a verdict of violence. Reaching a new intuition, al-Hurr asks for al-Husayn's forgiveness. The catalyst to this pivotal moment is described in al-Hurr's speech to the summoned Umayyad army made up of many Kufan soldiers. Al-Hurr calls them foolish and ill for initially inviting al-Husayn only to hand him over to death. They claimed to fight for him and now are ready to attack him. Al-Husayn is now trapped in the land where he was invited as an honorable guest and forbidden from using the nearby water. Al-Hurr ends by praying that the evil perpetrated on al-Husayn, the offspring of Muhammad, be reciprocated to the army on the day of judgement.

Al-Hurr's final decision indicates that he did not have prior interaction with Ubayd Allah to gauge the governor's character or intentions. This reaffirms the fact that al-Hurr had no knowledge of any Kufan support for al-Husayn. By siding with al-Husayn at the brink of battle, al-Hurr demonstrates his emerging moral integrity in opposition to the political corruption of Ubayd Allah ibn Ziyad and its fearful influence on Umar ibn Sa’d. Although al-Hurr added 30 men to al-Husayn's existing 72 followers, death was confirmed against the total 5,000 soldiers of the Umayyad army. Al-Hurr challenged soldiers in single combat, killing two of them. With fleeting time to eliminate more enemies, al-Hurr was one of the first to fall while fighting for Al-Husayn. He was killed by the Kufan soldier named Ayyub ibn Musarrih. Al-Hurr remains a testament to the awakening of warrior virtue in the path of justice for al-Husayn and his followers. His audacious decision, born out of increasing ethical qualms, took root when every extension of peace by al-Husayn was marred by Ubayd Allah ibn Ziyad.

== See also ==
- List of casualties in Husayn's army at the Battle of Karbala
- Burayr ibn Khudayr al-Hamdani
