= Burayr ibn Khudayr al-Hamdani =

Figure in Islamic history (d. 680)

Burayr ibn Khuḍayr al-Hamdānī (Arabic: بُرَيْر بن خُضَيْر ٱلْهَمْدَانِيّ) was descended from Bani Mashriq, a branch of Banu Hamdan, who were originally from Yemen. He was a Qāriʾ and used to teach Quran in Masjid al-Kufa. He was also one of the Tabi'un and a companion of Ali as well. When Burayr heard of Husayn ibn Ali's migration from Medina to Karbala, he left Kufa to join Husayn's army.

== Objection to Umar ibn Sa'd ==
Some companions of Husayn condemned Umar ibn Sa'd for denying water access to Husayn ibn Ali in the Battle of Karbala among whom was Burayr ibn Khudayr who went to Ibn Sa'd and called out whether he would leave the "family of prophethood to die of thirst" while he claimed he knew God and His Messenger.

== Mubahala with Yazid ==
Yazid bin Moqal, an ally of Abd al-Qays moved towards the camp of Husayn and reaching near, he called out in a loud voice to Burayr ibn Khudayr, asking how did he find what God had destined for him. Burayr replied that God had sent good with regard to him, and evil in regard with Yazid. In response Yazid called him a liar who was among deviated ones. Burayr challenged him to Mubahala (i.e. calling God's curse down upon whoever is liar). Yazid agreed and they came before the two camps to take part in the imprecation contest after which they attacked each other. It is said that Yazid's strike had no effect, however, Burayr's blow split Yazid's helmet and the sword reached up to his brain. He fell down and died a few moments later.

== Death ==
After killing Yazid, Burayr began to attack on the camp of Ibn Sa'd, calling them "murderers of the son of the daughter of the Messenger" of God. Razi ibn Munqidh Abadi attacked him and they fought for sometime. However Burayr subdued him and sat upon his chest. While he was engaged in this, the Ka'b ibn Jabir Azadi, delivered a blow with a spear on the back of Burayr and killed him. It is related that his killer was condemned by people including his wife, and his cousin, Ubayd Allah ibn Jabir. The killer, himself, was also ashamed and composed some couplets that described his grief and regret.

== See also ==
- Tasu'a
- List of casualties in Husayn's army at the Battle of Karbala
- Ashura
