= Umar ibn Sa'd =

Son of Sa'd ibn Abi Waqqas

- عمر بن سعد
- Born: Medina, Hijaz, Arabia
- Died: c. August 686; Kufa, Iraq
- Cause of death: Executed by Mukhtar al-Thaqafi
- Children: Hafs; Muhammad; Amir; Ibrahim; Mus'ab
- Relatives: Sa'd ibn Abi Waqqas (father)
- Military career
- Allegiance: Rashidun Caliphate; Umayyad Caliphate
- Commands: Commander of Ibn Ziyad's army in the Battle of Karbala

Abū Ḥafṣ ʿUmar ibn Saʿd ibn Abī Waqqāṣ (Arabic: عمر بن سعد; died 686) was the son of Sa'd ibn Abi Waqqas, a companion of the Islamic prophet Muhammad. He was a member of the Banu Zuhra tribe. Umar ibn Saʿd is primarily known for commanding the Kufan army sent by Ubayd Allah ibn Ziyad to confront Husayn ibn Ali at the Battle of Karbala in 680 CE, an engagement that led to Husayn’s death.

== Early life and lineage ==
Little is known about Umar ibn Saʿd’s childhood. He lived in Kufa and established relationships with the ruling Umayyads. According to Tabari, after the arbitration at Dumat al-Jandal following the Battle of Siffin in 657 CE, Umar approached his father, Sa'd ibn Abi Waqqas, urging him to attend the arbitration. He emphasized that as a companion of Muhammad and a respected member of the community, his father had the most right among those present to the caliphate. Sa'd, however, refused, citing Muhammad's warning about fitnah and choosing to remain neutral.

== Career in Kufa ==
Umar ibn Saʿd held administrative positions in Kufa and was trusted by the Umayyad authorities. He served as a tax collector in Hamadan and testified against Hujr ibn Adi during his trial.

== Role in the Battle of Karbala ==
In 680 CE (61 AH), Umar ibn Saʿd commanded the Kufan army sent by Ubayd Allah ibn Ziyad to confront Husayn ibn Ali at Karbala. Although initially reluctant to fight, he complied after Ibn Ziyad threatened to revoke his governorship of Rayy.

He arrived with a force of about 4,000 men, which later grew according to some sources. Umar ibn Saʿd coordinated the encirclement of Husayn’s camp and ordered measures to deny the defenders access to water, stationing horsemen along the route to the Euphrates. Husayn attempted negotiations and reportedly offered to leave or reach a compromise, but Ibn Ziyad refused and ordered Husayn to either submit or be attacked. Umar ibn Saʿd reluctantly carried out these orders, reportedly remarking that Husayn would not submit because of his proud soul.

During the battle, Umar ibn Saʿd directly commanded the Kufan army, ordering the burning of tents, encirclement of Husayn’s companions, and systematic attacks that led to the deaths of almost all of Husayn’s followers and relatives. He was present when Husayn was struck, surrounded, and ultimately killed. Reports indicate that Husayn’s family pleaded with him to intervene, but he remained passive and carried out Ibn Ziyad’s orders. He oversaw the taking of the survivors, including Husayn’s son Ali Zayn al-Abidin, as prisoners and the dismemberment or trampling of the dead as previously instructed.

As the field commander, Umar ibn Saʿd executed Ibn Ziyad’s instructions to blockade the Euphrates and engage Husayn's forces. He presided over the failed negotiations, the final assault, and the subsequent dispatch of survivors and spoils to Kufa.

== Death ==
In 686 CE (66 AH), Mukhtar al-Thaqafi executed Umar ibn Saʿd and his son Hafs, along with other prominent figures who had participated in the Battle of Karbala, as part of his campaign to avenge Husayn’s martyrdom.

== Bibliography ==
- Wellhausen, Julius (1901). Die religiös-politischen Oppositionsparteien im alten Islam (in German). Berlin: Weidmannsche Buchhandlung. OCLC 453206240.
- Madelung, Wilferd (2004). "Ḥosayn b. ʿAli I. Life and Significance in Shiʿism". Encyclopaedia Iranica. Vol. 7. Encyclopædia Iranica Foundation.
- al-Tabari, Muhammad ibn Jarir (1998). The History of the Prophets and Kings: Volume 17, The First Civil War. Vol. 17. Translated by G. R. Hawting. State University of New York Press.
- al-Tabari, Muhammad ibn Jarir (1998). The History of the Prophets and Kings: Volume 18, The Caliphate of Mu'awiyah. Vol. 18. Translated by Michael G. Morony. State University of New York Press.
- al-Tabari, Muhammad ibn Jarir (1990). The History of the Prophets and Kings: Volume 19, The Caliphate of Yazid ibn Mu'awiyah. Translated by I. K. A. Howard. State University of New York Press. ISBN 978-0-7914-0040-1.
- Donner, Fred M. (2010). Muhammad and the Believers, at the Origins of Islam. Cambridge, MA: Harvard University Press. ISBN 978-0-674-05097-6.
- Ayoub, Mahmoud (1978). Redemptive Suffering in Islam: A Study of the Devotional Aspects of Ashura in Twelver Shi'ism. Hague: Mouton Publishers. ISBN 90-279-7943-X.
- Vaglieri, L. Veccia (1971). "(Al)-Ḥusayn b. 'Alï b. Abï Ṭālib". In Lewis, B.; Ménage, V. L.; Pellat, Ch. & Schacht, J. (eds.). The Encyclopaedia of Islam, Second Edition. Volume III: H–Iram. Leiden: E. J. Brill. pp. 607–615. OCLC 495469525.
