= Husayn ibn Ali =

7th-century Islamic leader

Husayn ibn Ali حسين ابن علي
- Sayyid Shabāb Ahl al-Janna; Sayyid al-Shuhada; Abu Abd Allah; Sibt an-Nabi; Al-Maẓlūm; Thār Allāh
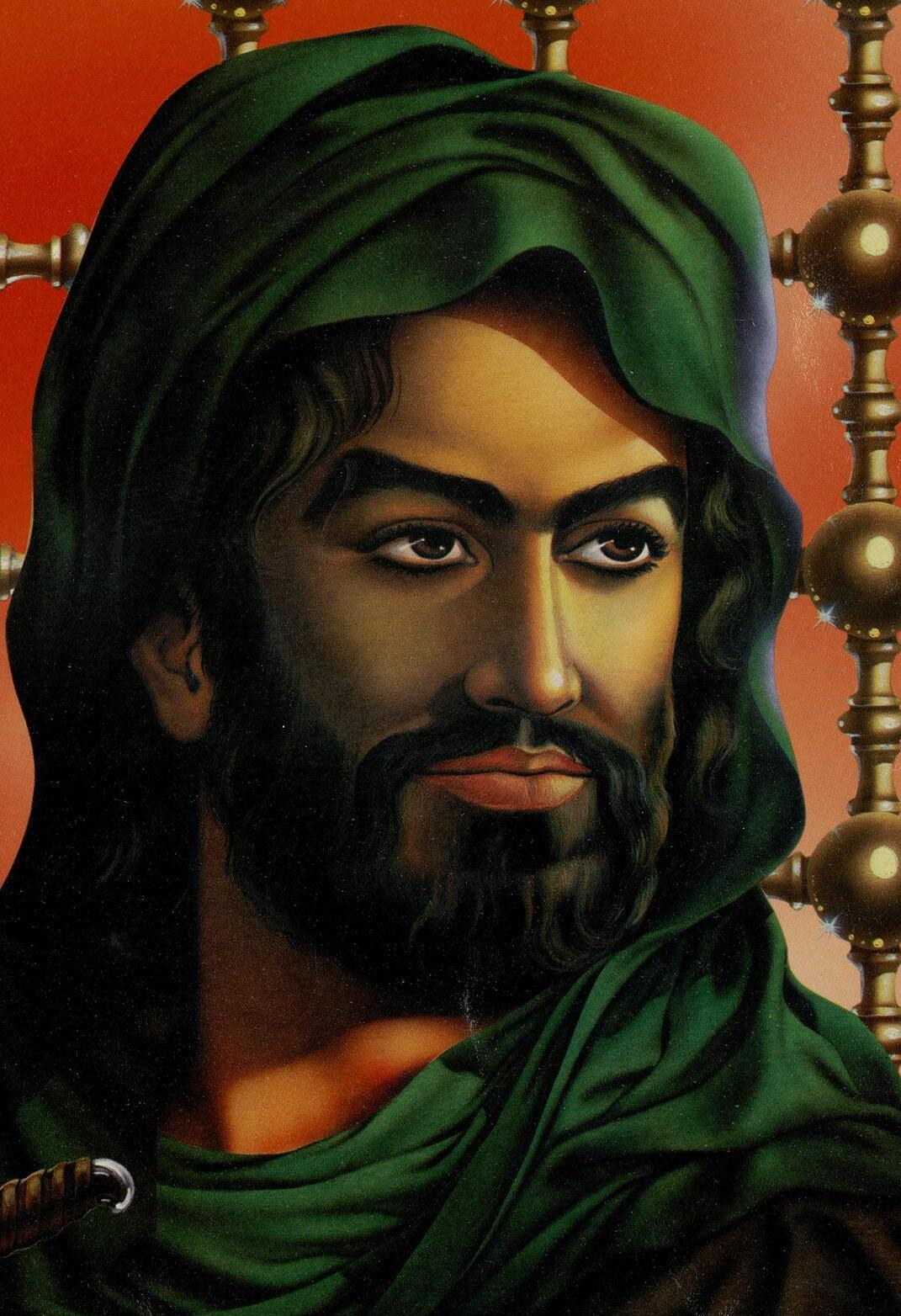
- A conventional artistic depiction of Husayn ibn Ali in the Shia tradition by Abolfazl Mirzabeygi, 1980
- Born: 11 January 626 CE (3 Sha'ban 4 AH); Medina, First Islamic state
- Died: 10 October 680 CE (aged 54) (10 Muharram 61 AH); Karbala, Umayyad Caliphate
- Cause of death: Killed and beheaded at the Battle of Karbala
- Burial: Imam Husayn Shrine, Iraq; 32.616389°N 44.0325°E
- Spouse: Shahrbanu; Atika bint Zayd; Umm Rubab; Umm Layla; Umm Ishaq
- Issue: Descendants of Husayn: Ali al-Akbar; Ali al-Sajjad; Ja'far; Muhammad; Fatima al-Kubra; Fatima as-Sughra; Zaynab; Sakina; Ruqayya; Ali al-Asghar
- Tribe: Quraysh (Banu Hashim)
- Father: Ali ibn Abi Talib
- Mother: Fatima bint Muhammad
- Religion: Islam

3rd Shia Imam
- In office 2 April 670 – 10 October 680
- Preceded by: Hasan ibn Ali
- Succeeded by: Ali al-Sajjad

Husayn ibn Ali (Arabic: حسين ابن علي, romanized: Ḥusayn ibn ʿAlī; 11 January 626 – 10 October 680 CE) was an Alid political and religious leader. The second son of Ali and Fatima and a grandson of the Islamic prophet Muhammad, as well as a younger brother of Hasan ibn Ali, Husayn is regarded as the third Imam in Shia Islam after his brother, Hasan, and before his son, Ali al-Sajjad. Husayn is a prominent member of the Ahl al-Bayt and is also considered to be a member of the Ahl al-Kisa and a participant in the event of the mubahala. Muhammad described him and his brother, Hasan, as the leaders of the youth of paradise.

During the caliphate of Ali, Husayn accompanied him in the military campaigns of the First Fitna. After the assassination of Ali, he obeyed his brother in recognizing the Hasan–Mu'awiya treaty, despite being suggested to do otherwise. In the nine-year period between Hasan's abdication in AH 41 (660) and his death in AH 49 or 50 (669 or 670), Hasan and Husayn retreated to Medina, trying to keep aloof from political involvement for or against Mu'awiya I. After the death of Hasan, when Kufans turned to Husayn, concerning an uprising, Husayn instructed them to wait as long as Mu'awiya was alive due to Hasan's peace treaty with him.

Prior to his death, Mu'awiya appointed his son Yazid as his successor, contrary to the Hasan–Mu'awiya treaty. When Mu'awiya I died in 680, Yazid demanded that Husayn pledge allegiance to him. Husayn refused to do so. As a consequence, he left Medina, his hometown, to take refuge in Mecca in AH 60 (679). There, the people of Kufa sent letters to him, invited him to Kufa and asked him to be their Imam and pledged their allegiance to him. On Husayn's way to Kufa with a retinue of about 72 men, his caravan was intercepted by a 1,000-strong army of the caliph at some distance from Kufa. He was forced to head north and encamp in the plain of Karbala on 2 October, where a larger Umayyad army of some 4,000 or 30,000 arrived soon afterwards. Negotiations failed after the Umayyad governor Ubayd Allah ibn Ziyad refused Husayn safe passage without submitting to his authority, a condition declined by Husayn. Battle ensued on 10 October during which Husayn was killed along with most of his relatives and companions, while his surviving family members were taken prisoner. The battle was followed by the Second Fitna, during which the Kufans organized two separate campaigns to avenge the killing of Husayn; the first one by the Tawwabin and the other one by Mukhtar al-Thaqafi and his supporters.

The Battle of Karbala galvanized the development of the pro-Alid (Note: Political supporters of Ali and his descendants (Alids).) party (Shi'at Ali) into a unique religious sect with its own rituals and collective memory. It has a central place in the Shi'a history, tradition, and theology, and has frequently been recounted in Shi'a literature. For the Shi'a, Husayn's suffering and martyrdom became a symbol of sacrifice in the struggle for right against wrong, and for justice and truth against injustice and falsehood. It also provides the members of the Shi'a faith with a catalog of heroic norms. The battle is commemorated during an annual ten-day period during the Islamic month of Muharram by many Muslims especially Shi'a, culminating on tenth day of the month, known as the day of Ashura. On this day, Shi'a Muslims mourn, hold public processions, organise religious gathering, beat their chests and in some cases self-flagellate. Sunni Muslims likewise regard the incident as a historical tragedy; Husayn and his companions are widely regarded as martyrs by both Sunni and Shi'a Muslims.

== Early life ==
Most narrations report that Husayn was born on the 3rd of Sha'ban 4 AH (11 January 626) in Medina and was still a child when his grandfather, Muhammad, died. He was the younger son of Ali, the cousin of Muhammad, and Fatima, the daughter of Muhammad, both from the Banu Hashim clan of the Quraysh tribe. Both Hasan and Husayn were named by Muhammad, although Ali had other names such as "Harb" in mind. Muhammad sacrificed a ram to celebrate Husayn's birth, and Fatima shaved his head and donated the same weight of his hair in silver as alms.

Islamic traditions holds Husayn is mentioned in the Torah as "Shubayr" and in the Gospels as "Tab".

Husayn was raised in Muhammad's household during his early years. The family formed from the marriage of Ali and Fatima was praised many times by Muhammad. In events such as Mubahala and the hadith of the Ahl al-Kisa, Muhammad referred to this family as the Ahl al-bayt. In the Qur'an, in many cases, such as the verse of purification, the ahl al-bayt has been praised.

Madelung notes that numerous narrations showing Muhammad's love for Hasan and Husayn, such as carrying them on his shoulders or putting them on his chest and kissing them on their bellies. Madelung believes that some of these reports may imply a slight preference of Muhammad for Hasan over Husayn, or pointing out that Hasan was more similar to his grandfather.

A hadith in the canonical Sunni collection Sunan al-Tirmidhi states al-Hasan and al-Husayn as the sayyids (“chiefs”) of the youth in Paradise. Madelung adds that this hadith is widely reported.

Other similar Hadiths include: "Whoever loves them loves me and whoever hates them hates me", and "al-Hasan and al-Husayn are the sayyids [masters] of the youth of Paradise". The recent one is used by Shia to prove the right of Imamate for the descendants of Muhammad. Sayyid Shabāb Ahl al-Jannah (Note: Meaning "The Master of the youth of Paradise") is an epithet used by Shias to refer to each of Muhammad's grandsons. It is also narrated that Muhammad took Ali, Fatima, Hasan and Husayn under his cloak and called them Ahl al-bayt and stated that they are free from any sin and pollution. Muhammad reported the Karbala incident on several occasions; For example, he gave a small bottle of soil to Umm Salama and told her that the soil inside the bottle would turn into blood after Husayn was killed.

=== Event of Mubahala ===
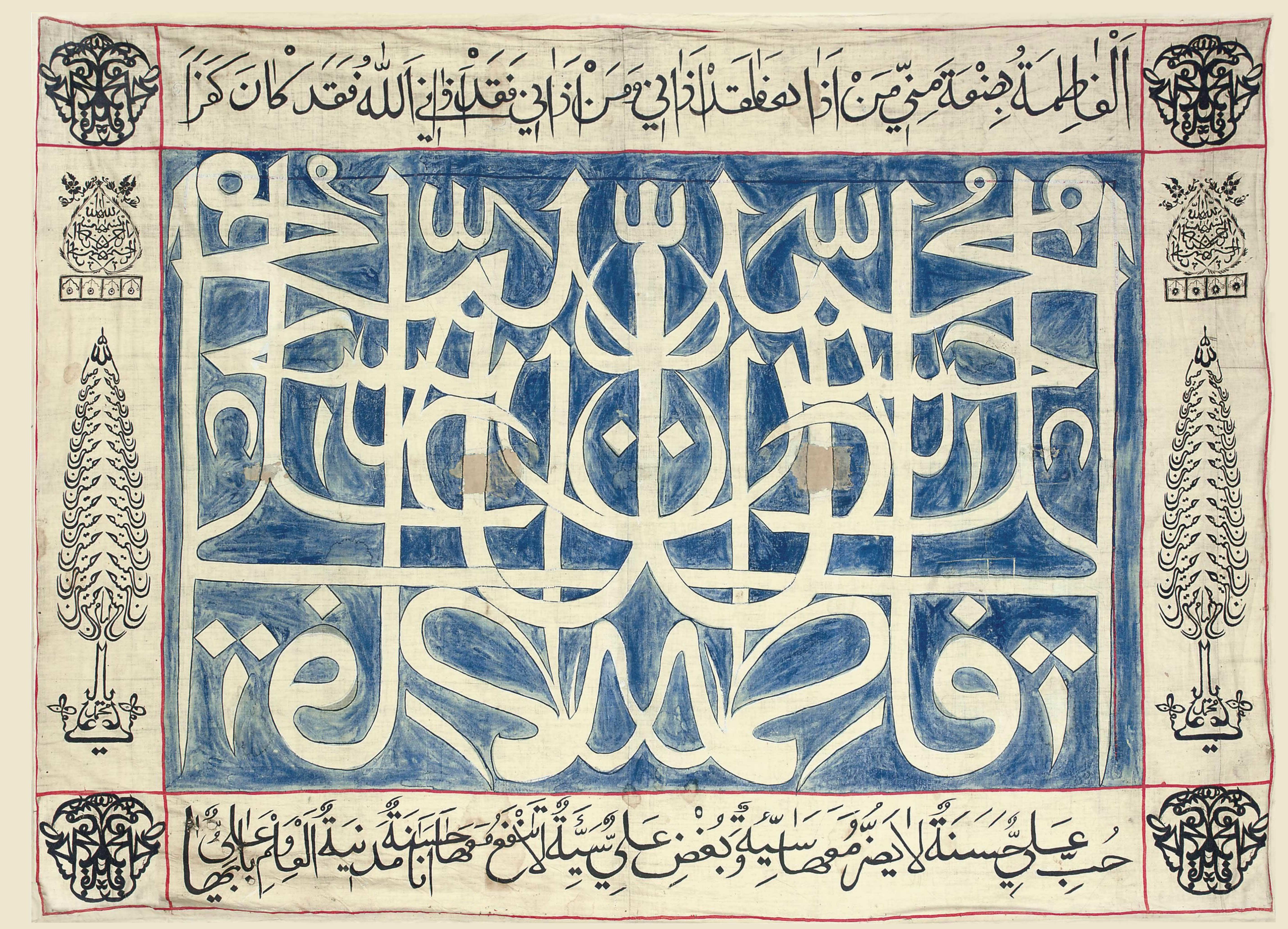
The calligraphy of the names of ahl al-kisa and two hadiths of Muhammad on the cloth, probably belonging to Iran or Central Asia

In the year 10 AH (631–632) a Christian envoy from Najran (now in northern Yemen) came to Muhammad to argue which of the two parties erred in its doctrine concerning Jesus. After likening Jesus' miraculous birth to Adam's creation — who was born to neither a mother nor a father— and when the Christians did not accept the Islamic doctrine about Jesus, Muhammad reportedly received a revelation instructing him to call them to Mubahala, where each party should ask God to destroy the false party and their families:

If anyone dispute with you in this matter [concerning Jesus] after the knowledge which has come to you, say: Come let us call our sons and your sons, our women and your women, ourselves and yourselves, then let us swear an oath and place the curse of God on those who lie.(Qur'an 3:61)

In Shia perspective, in the verse of Mubahala, the phrase "our sons" would refer to Hasan and Husayn, "our women" refers to Fatima, and "ourselves" refers to Ali. Most of the Sunni narrations quoted by al-Tabari do not name the participants. Other Sunni historians mention Muhammad, Fatima, Hasan and Husayn as having participated in the Mubahala, and some agree with the Shia tradition that Ali was among them.

The verse "God wishes only to remove taint from you, people of the Household, and to make you utterly pure" is also attributed to this event, (Note: "see, for example, ṢaḥīḥMoslem, English tr. by A. H. Siddiqui, Lahore, 1975, IV, pp. 1293–1294") during which Ali, Fatima, Hasan and Husayn stood under Muhammad's cloak. Thus the title, the Family of the Cloak, is related sometimes to the Event of Mubahala. (Note: see L. Massignon, La Mubahala de Médine et l'hyperdulie de Fatima, Paris, 1935; idem, "Mubāhala," EI1, supplement, p. 150)

== During the caliphates of Abu Bakr, Umar and Uthman ==
During the caliphate of Abu Bakr and Umar, Husayn was present at some events such as testifying about the story of Fadak. According to a narration, Husayn, while the second caliph was sitting on the pulpit of Muhammad and giving a speech, objected to him for sitting on the pulpit of Muhammad, and Umar also stopped his sermon and came down from the pulpit. During the time of Uthman, he defended Abu Dharr al-Ghifari, who had preached against some of the actions of the tyrants and was to be exiled from Medina.

According to several narrations, Ali asked Hasan and Husayn to defend the third Caliph during the Siege of Uthman and carry water to him. According to Vaglieri, when Hasan entered Uthman's house, Uthman was already assassinated. Another report says that Uthman asked Ali's help. The latter send Husayn in response. Then Uthman asked Husayn if he was able to defend himself against rebels. Husayn demurred, so Uthman sent him back. It is also narrated that Uthman's cousin, Marwan ibn al-Hakam, have said Husayn: "Leave us, your father incites the people against us, and you are here with us!" Haeri writes in the Encyclopedia of the Islamic World: According to some narrations, Husayn or Hasan were wounded in the case of defending Uthman.

== During the caliphates of Ali and Hasan ==
During the Caliphate of Ali, Husayn, along with his brothers Hasan and Muhammad ibn al-Hanafiyya, and his cousin, Abdullah ibn Ja'far were among closest allies of Ali. He remained alongside him, accompanying him in the battlefields. According to a report by Tabari, Husayn was among Ali's major supporters who were cursed in public by the order of Mu'awiya I.

After the assassination of Ali people gave allegiance to Hasan. Mu'awiya who did not want to give allegiance to him, prepared to fight. To avoid the agonies of the civil war, Hasan signed a treaty with Mu'awiya I, according to which Mu'awiya I would not name a successor during his reign, and let the Islamic community (ummah) choose his successor. Madelung believes that Husayn did not recognize this treaty at first, but pressed by Hasan, accepted it. Later on when several Shia leaders suggested him to conduct a surprise attack on Mu'awiya I's camp near Kufa, he refused, saying that as long as Mu'awiya I was alive, he would abide by the terms of the peace treaty, however, after Mu'awiya I's death, he will reconsider it. After signing the peace treaty, Mu'awiyah I delivered a sermon in Kufa in which he declared that he had violated all the provisions of the treaty and also insulted Ali ibn Abi Talib. Husayn wanted to respond, but Hasan refused to do so, and Hasan delivered a sermon in response. Husayn then left Kufa for Medina along with Hasan and Abdullah ibn Ja'far. He adhered to the terms of the treaty even after Hasan's death.

== During the caliphate of Mu'awiya I ==
According to the Shi'a, Husayn was the third Imam for a period of ten years after the death of his brother Hasan in 670. All of this time except the last six months coincided with the caliphate of Mu'awiya I. In the nine-year period between Hasan's abdication in AH 41 (660) and his death in AH 49 (669), Hasan and Husayn retreated to Medina, trying to keep aloof from political involvement for or against Mu'awiya I. Sentiments in favor of the rule of Ahl al-Bayt occasionally emerged in the form of small groups, mostly from Kufa, visiting Hasan and Husayn asking them to be their leaders – a request to which they declined to respond. When Hasan was poisoned, he refused to tell Husayn the name of his suspect, probably Mu'awiya I, in fear of provoking bloodshed. The burial of Hasan's body near that of Muhammad, was another problem which could have led to bloodshed, as Marwan ibn al-Hakam swore that he would not permit Hasan to be buried near Muhammad with Abu Bakr and Umar, while Uthman was buried in the cemetery of al-Baqi. After the death of Hasan, when Kufans turned to Husayn, concerning an uprising, Husayn instructed them to wait as long as Mu'awiya I was alive due to Hasan's peace treaty with him. Meanwhile, Marwan reported to Mu'awiya I the frequent visits of Shias to Husayn. Mu'awiya I instructed Marwan not to clash with Husayn, in the same time he wrote a letter to Husayn in which he "mingled generous promises with the advice not to provoke him." Later on, when Mu'awiya was taking allegiance for his son, Yazid, Husayn was among the five prominent persons who did not give his allegiance, as appointing a successor was in violation of Hasan's peace treaty with Mu'awiya I. Before his death in April 680, Mu'awiya I cautioned Yazid that Husayn and Abd Allah ibn al-Zubayr might challenge his rule and instructed him to defeat them if they did. Yazid was further advised to treat Husayn with caution and not to spill his blood, since he was the grandson of Muhammad.

== Uprising ==
=== Refusal to give allegiance to Yazid ===
Immediately after Mu'awiya's death on 15th of Rajab 60 AH (22 April 680), Yazid charged the governor of Medina, Walid ibn Utba ibn Abu Sufyan, to secure allegiance from Husayn with force if necessary. Yazid's goal was to take control of the situation in the city before the people became aware of Mu'awiya I's death. Yazid's concern was especially about his two rivals in the caliphate, Husayn and Abd Allah ibn al-Zubayr who had previously renounced allegiance.

Husayn answered the summons but declined to pledge allegiance in the secretive environment of the meeting, suggesting it should be done in public. Marwan ibn al-Hakam told Walid to imprison or behead him, but due to Husayn's kinship with Muhammad, Walid was unwilling to take any action against him. A few days later, Husayn left for Mecca without acknowledging Yazid. He arrived in Mecca at the beginning of May 680, and stayed there until the beginning of September. He was accompanied by his wives, children and brothers, as well as Hasan's sons.

=== Invitations from Kufa ===
Husayn had considerable support in Kufa, which had been the caliphal capital during the reigns of his father and brother. The Kufans had fought the Umayyads and their Syrian allies during the First Fitna, the five-year civil war which had established the Umayyad Caliphate. They were dissatisfied with Hasan's abdication and strongly resented Umayyad rule. While in Mecca, Husayn received letters from pro-Alids in Kufa informing him that they were tired of the Umayyad rule, which they considered to be oppressive, and that they had no rightful leader. They asked him to lead them in revolt against Yazid, promising to remove the Umayyad governor if Husayn would consent to aid them. Husayn wrote back affirmatively that a rightful leader is the one who acts according to the Qur'an and promised to lead them with the right guidance. Then he sent his cousin Muslim ibn Aqil to assess the situation in Kufa. Ibn Aqil attracted widespread support and informed Husayn of the situation, suggesting that he join them there. Yazid removed Nu'man ibn Bashir al-Ansari as governor of Kufa due to his inaction and installed Ubayd Allah ibn Ziyad, then governor of Basra, in his place. As a result of Ibn Ziyad's suppression and political maneuvering, Ibn Aqil's following began to dissipate and he was forced to declare the revolt prematurely. It was defeated and Ibn Aqil was killed.

Husayn had also sent a messenger to Basra, another garrison town in Iraq, but the messenger could not attract any following and was quickly apprehended and executed.

Husayn was unaware of the change of political circumstances in Kufa and decided to depart. Abd Allah ibn Abbas and Abd Allah ibn al-Zubayr advised him not to move to Iraq, or, if he was determined, not to take women and children with him. (Note: The sincerity of Ibn al-Zubayr's advice has been doubted by many historians, however, as he had his own plans for leadership and was supposedly happy to be rid of Husayn.) Nevertheless, he offered Husayn support if he would stay in Mecca and lead the opposition to Yazid from there. Husayn refused this, citing his abhorrence of bloodshed in the sanctuary, and decided to go ahead with his plan.

=== Journey towards Kufa ===
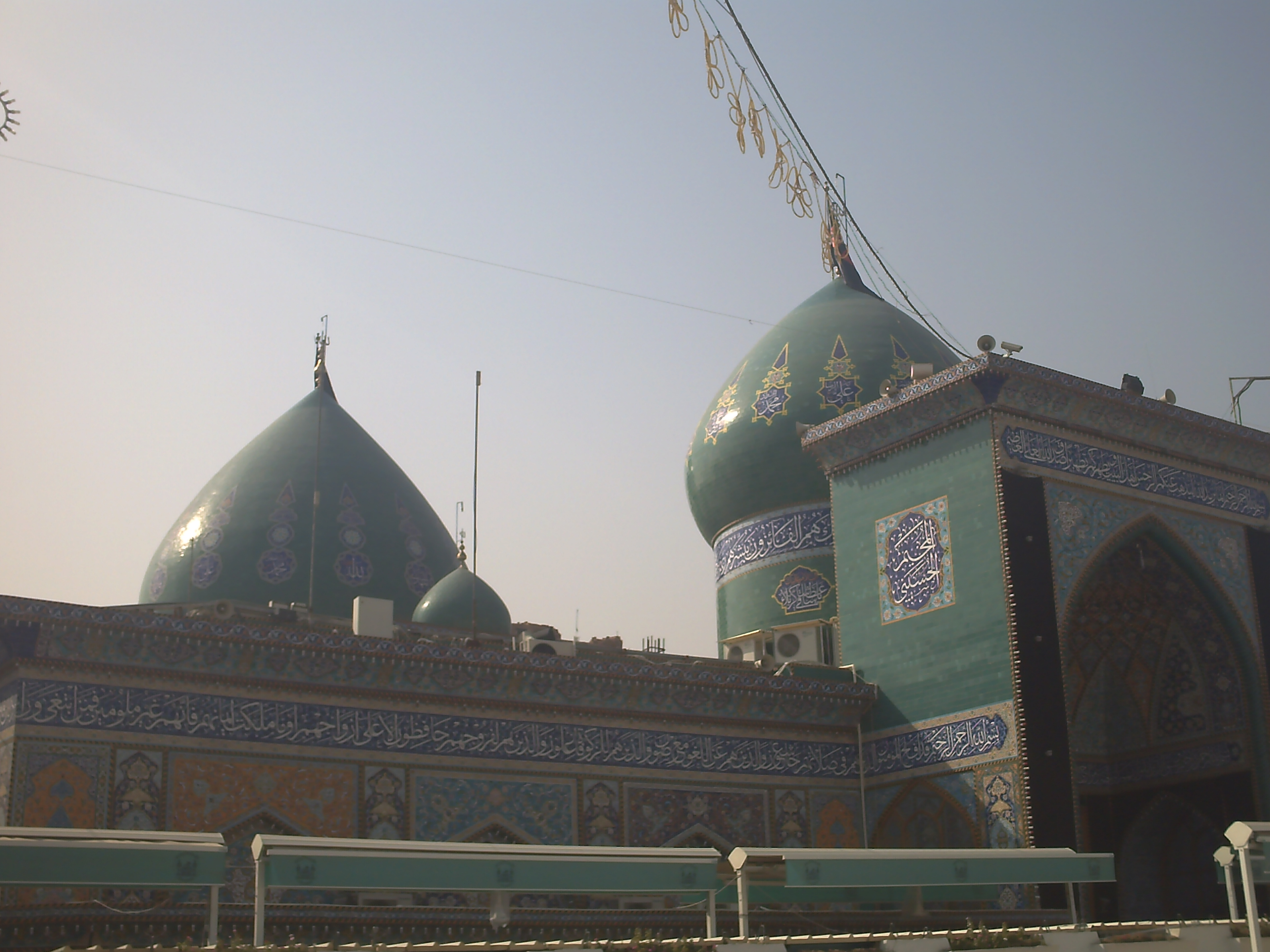
A shrine built at the location of Husayn's camp

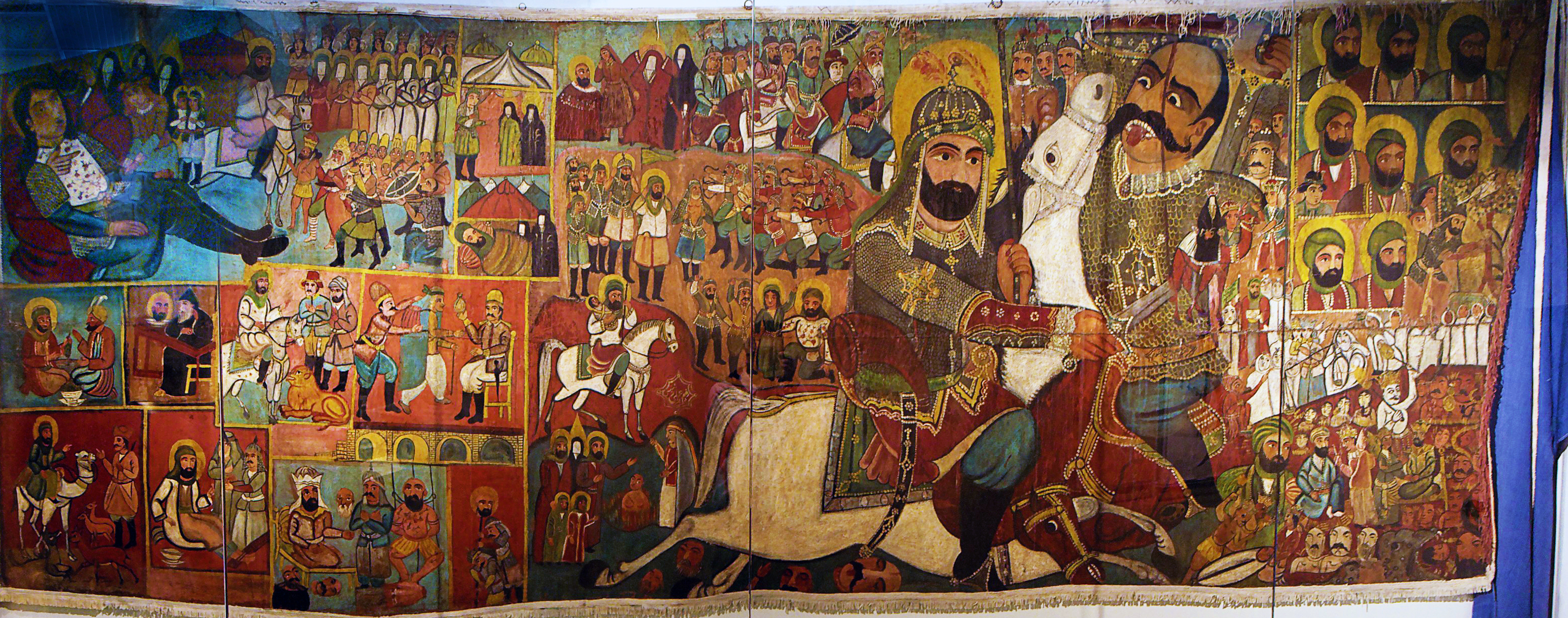
Depiction of the twelve Imams and episodes from their lives including the Battle of Karbala, Iranian painting, oil on canvas, 19th century from the Tropenmuseum Amsterdam

Despite the advice of Muhammad ibn Hanafiyya, Abdullah ibn Umar, and the constant insistence of Abd Allah ibn Abbas in Mecca, Husayn did not back down from his decision to go to Kufa. Ibn 'Abbas pointed out that the Kufis had left both his father Ali and his brother Hasan alone, and suggested that Husayn go to Yemen instead of Kufa, or at least not take women and children with him if he were to go to Iraq. Husayn insisted on his decision and wrote about his motives and goals in a famous letter or will that he gave to Muhammad ibn al Hanafiyyah:

"I did not go out for fun and selfishness and for corruption and oppression; Rather, my goal is to correct the corruptions that have occurred in the nation of my ancestors. I want to command the good and forbid the bad, and follow the tradition of my grandfather and the way of my father Ali ibn Abi Talib. So, whoever accepts this truth (and follows me) has accepted the way of God and whoever rejects (and does not follow me) I will walk (my way) with patience and perseverance so that God may be the judge between me and this nation and he is the best judge."

Then, Husayn, who had not yet received the letters of the new events of Kufa, prepared to leave for Kufa on the 8th or 10th of Dhu al-Hijjah 60 AH / 10 or 12 September 680. Instead of performing Hajj, he performed Umrah, and in the absence of the Governor of Mecca, Amr ibn Sa'id ibn As, who was performing Hajj on the outskirts of the city, secretly left the city with his companions and family. Fifty men from Husayn's relatives and friends – who could fight if needed – accompanied Husayn, including women and children. He took the northerly route through the Arabian Desert. On persuasion of Husayn's cousin Abd Allah ibn Ja'far, the governor of Mecca Amr ibn Sa'id sent his brother and Ibn Ja'far after Husayn in order to assure him safety in Mecca and bring him back. Husayn refused to return, relating that Muhammad had ordered him in a dream to move forward irrespective of the consequences. Further on the way, he received the news of the execution of Ibn Aqil and the indifference of the people of Kufa. (Note: Husayn at this point is reported to have considered turning back, but was persuaded to push forward by Ibn Aqil's brothers, who wanted to avenge his death; according to Madelung and I. K. A. Howard, these reports are doubtful.) He informed his followers of the situation and asked them to leave. Most of the people who had joined him on the way left, while his companions from Mecca decided to stay with him.

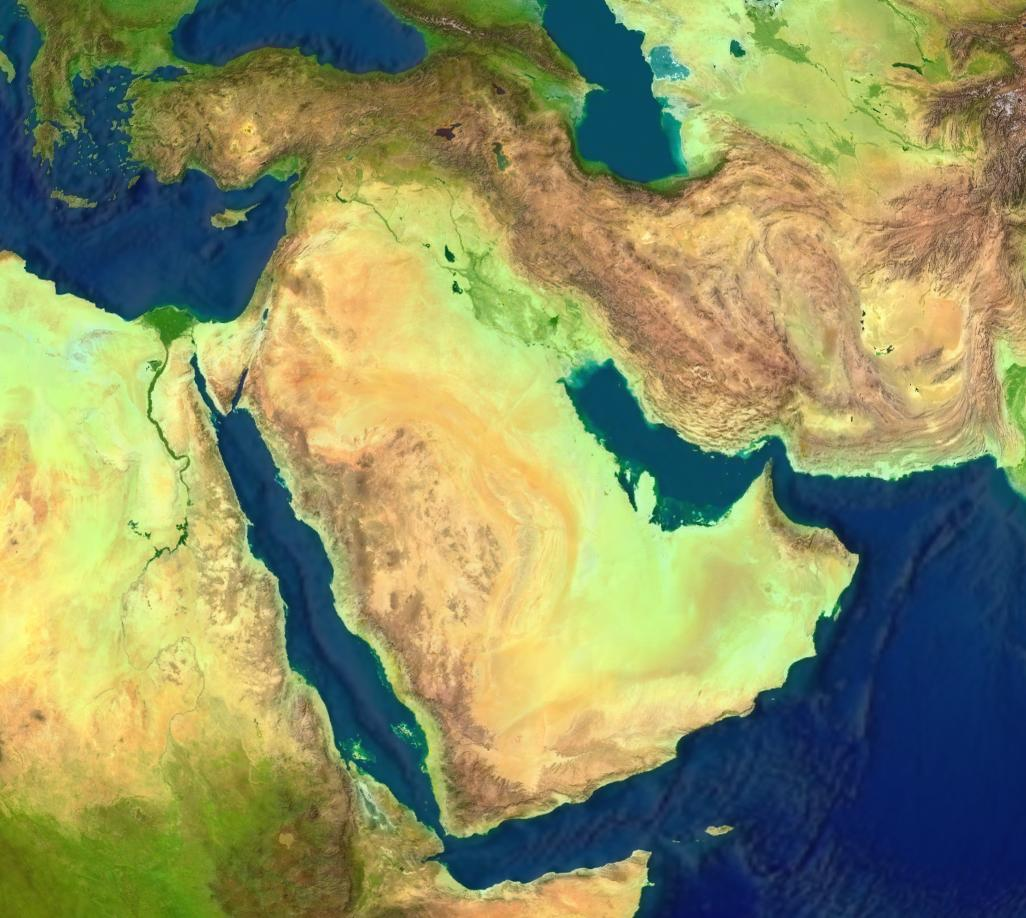
Husayn traveled from Mecca to Kufa through the Arabian Desert.

On the way, Husayn encountered various people. In response to Husayn's question about the situation in Iraq, the poet Farzadaq explicitly told him that the hearts of the Iraqi people are with you, but their swords are in the service of the Umayyads. But Husayn's decision was unwavering, and in response to those who tried to dissuade him, he said that things were in God's hands and that God wanted the best for His servants and would not be hostile to anyone who was right. The news of the murder of Muslim ibn Aqeel and Hani ibn Arwa was reported by some travellers, for the first time in Thalabiyah.

When Husayn reached the area of Zabalah, he found out that his messenger, Qais ibn Mushar Sa'idawi – or his brother-in-law, Abd Allah ibn Yaqtar – who had been sent from Hejaz to Kufa to inform the people of Husayn's imminent arrival, was exposed and killed by falling from the roof of Kufa Palace. Upon hearing this, Husayn allowed his supporters to leave the caravan due to the depressing issues such as the betrayal of the Kufis. A number of those who had joined him on the way parted away. But those who had come with Husayn from Hejaz did not leave him. The news from Kufa showed that the situation there had completely changed from what Muslims had reported. The political assessments made it clear to Husayn that going to Kufa was no longer apt.

In the area of Sharaf or Zuhsam, armies emerged from Kufa under the leadership of Hurr ibn Yazid. With the weather being hot there, Husayn ordered water to be given to them and then announced his motives to the army and said: "You did not have an Imam and I became the means of uniting the ummah. Our family is more deserving of government than anyone else, and those in power do not deserve it and rule unjustly. If you support me, I will go to Kufa. But if you do not want me anymore, I will return to my first place."

Ibn Ziyad had stationed troops on the routes into Kufa. Husayn and his followers were intercepted by the vanguard of Yazid's army, about 1,000 men led by Al-Hurr ibn Yazid Al-Tamimi, south of Kufa near Qadisiyya. Husayn said to them:

I did not come to you until your letters were brought to me, and your messengers came to me saying, "Come to us, for we have no imam" ... Therefore, if you give me what you guaranteed in your covenants and sworn testimonies, I will come to your town. If you will not and are averse to my coming, I will leave you for the place from which I came to you.

He then showed them the letters he had received from the Kufans, including some in Hurr's force. Al-Hurr ibn Yazid Al-Tamimi denied any knowledge of the letters and stated that Husayn must go with him to Ibn Ziyad, which Husayn refused to do. Hurr responded that he would not allow Husayn to either enter Kufa or go back to Medina, but that he was free to travel anywhere else he wished. Nevertheless, he did not prevent four Kufans from joining Husayn. Husayn's caravan started to move towards Qadisiyya, and Hurr followed them. At Naynawa, Hurr received orders from Ibn Ziyad to force Husayn's caravan to halt in a desolate place without fortifications or water. One of Husayn's companions suggested that they attack Hurr and move to the fortified village of al-Aqr. Husayn refused, stating that he did not want to start the hostilities.

According to Valiri, Hurr ordered his army to take Husayn and his companions to Ibn Ziyad without fighting and intended to persuade Husayn to do so. But when he saw that Husayn was moving his caravan, he did not dare to follow it. However, Madlung and Bahramian write that when Husayn was ready to leave, Hurr blocked his way and said that if Husayn did not accept the order given by Ibn Ziyad, Hurr would not allow him to go to Medina or Kufa. He suggested to Husayn to neither go to Kufa nor to Medina, rather write a letter to Yazid or Ibn Ziyad and wait for their orders, hoping to avoid this difficult situation by receiving an answer. But Husayn did not heed to his advice and continued to Azad or Qadisiyah. Hurr informed Husayn that he was doing this for Husayn and that if there would be a war, Husayn would be killed. Husayn, however, was not afraid of death and stopped in an area called Karbala, on the outskirts of Kufa.

In one place, Husayn recited a sermon and said: "I do not see death except as martyrdom and living with the oppressors except as hardship." In another place, he explained the reason for his opposition to the government while recalling the bitterness of breaking the allegiance of the people of Kufa with his father and brother, saying, "These people have submitted to the obedience of Satan and have left the obedience of God the Merciful." On the way, he refused to accept the offer to go to the tribe of Tayy by pointing to his pact with Hurr about not returning. Later, a messenger from Ibn Ziad came to Hurr and, without greeting Husayn, gave a letter to Hurr in which Ibn Ziad had ordered him not to stop in a place where Husayn can have easy access to water. With this letter, Obaidullah wanted to force Husayn to fight. Zuhair ibn Qayn suggested to Husayn to attack the small army of Hurr and capture the fortified village of Akr. But Husayn did not accept, because he did not want to start a war.

On 2 October 680 (2 Muharram 61 AH), Husayn arrived at Karbala, a desert plain 70 kilometers (43 mi) north of Kufa, and set up camp.

On the following day, a 4,000-strong Kufan army arrived under the command of Umar ibn Sa'd. He had been appointed governor of Rayy to suppress a local rebellion but then recalled to confront Husayn. Initially, he was unwilling to fight Husayn, but complied following Ibn Ziyad's threat to revoke his governorship. After negotiations with Husayn, Ibn Sa'd wrote to Ibn Ziyad that Husayn was willing to return. Ibn Ziyad replied that Husayn must surrender or he should be subdued by force, and that to compel him, he and his companions should be denied access to the Euphrates river. Ibn Sa'd stationed 500 horsemen on the route leading to the river. Husayn and his companions remained without water for three days before a group of fifty men led by his half-brother Abbas ibn Ali was able to access the river. They could only fill twenty water-skins.

Husayn and Ibn Sa'd met during the night to negotiate a settlement; it was rumored that Husayn made three proposals: either he be allowed to return to Medina, submit to Yazid directly, or be sent to a border post where he would fight alongside the Muslim armies. According to Madelung, these reports are probably untrue as Husayn at this stage is unlikely to have considered submitting to Yazid. A mawla of Husayn's wife later claimed that Husayn had suggested that he be allowed to leave, so that all parties could allow the fluid political situation to clarify. Ibn Sa'd sent the proposal, whatever it was, to Ibn Ziyad, who is reported to have accepted but then persuaded otherwise by Shimr ibn Dhi al-Jawshan. Shimr argued that Husayn was in his domain and letting him go would be to demonstrate weakness. Ibn Ziyad then sent Shimr with orders to ask Husayn for his allegiance once more and to attack, kill and disfigure him if he was to refuse, as "a rebel, a seditious person, a brigand, an oppressor and he was to do no further harm after his death". If Ibn Sa'd was unwilling to carry out the attack, he was instructed to hand over command to Shimr. Ibn Sa'd cursed Shimr and accused him of foiling his attempts to reach a peaceful settlement but agreed to carry out the orders. He remarked that Husayn would not submit because there was "a proud soul in him".

The army advanced toward Husayn's camp on the evening of 9 October. Husayn sent Abbas to ask Ibn Sa'd to wait until the next morning, so that they could consider the matter. Ibn Sa'd agreed to this respite. Husayn told his men that they were all free to leave, with his family, under the cover of night, since their opponents only wanted him. Very few availed themselves of this opportunity. Defense arrangements were made: tents were brought together and tied to one another and a ditch was dug behind the tents and filled with wood ready to be set alight in case of attack. Husayn and his followers then spent the rest of the night praying.

=== Battle of Karbala ===
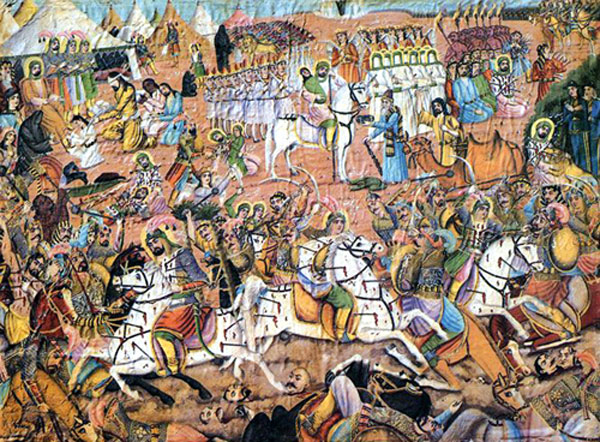
The Battle of Karbala By Iranian painter Mohammad Modabber

After the morning prayer on 10 October, both parties took up battle positions. Husayn appointed Zuhayr ibn Qayn to command the right flank of his army, Habib ibn Muzahir to command the left flank, and his half-brother Abbas as the standard bearer. Husayn's companions, according to most accounts, numbered thirty-two horsemen and forty infantrymen. (Note: Although forty-five horsemen and one hundred foot-soldiers, or a total of a few hundred men have been reported by some sources.) Ibn Sa'd's army totaled 4,000. (Note: According to the Shi'a sources, however, more troops had joined Ibn Sa'd in preceding days, swelling his army to 30,000 strong.) The ditch containing wood were set alight. Husayn then delivered a speech to his opponents reminding them of his status as Muhammad's grandson and reproaching them for inviting and then abandoning him. He asked to be allowed to leave. He was told that first he had to submit to Yazid's authority, which he refused to do. Husayn's speech moved Hurr to defect to his side.

After Husayn's speech, Zuhayr ibn Qayn attempted to dissuade Ibn Sa'd's soldiers from killing Husayn, but in vain. Ibn Sa'd's army fired several volleys of arrows. This was followed by duels in which several of Husayn's companions were slain. The right wing of the Kufans, led by Amr ibn al-Hajjaj, attacked Husayn's force but was repulsed. Hand-to-hand fighting paused and further volleys of arrows were exchanged. Shimr, who commanded the left wing of the Umayyad army, launched an attack, but after losses on both sides, he was repulsed. This was followed by cavalry attacks. Husayn's cavalry resisted fiercely and Ibn Sa'd brought in armoured cavalry and five hundred archers. After their horses were wounded by arrows, Husayn's cavalrymen dismounted and fought on foot.

Since Umayyad forces could approach Husayn's army from the front only, Ibn Sa'd ordered the tents to be burned. All except the one which Husayn and his family were using were set on fire. Shimr wanted to burn that one too, but was prevented by his companions. The plan backfired and flames hindered the Umayyad advance for a while. After noon prayers, Husayn's companions were encircled, and almost all of them were killed. Husayn's relatives, who had not taken part in the fighting so far, joined the battle. Husayn's son Ali Akbar was killed; then Husayn's half-brothers, including Abbas, and the sons of Aqil ibn Abi Talib, Jafar ibn Abi Talib and Hasan ibn Ali were slain. The account of Abbas' death is not given in the primary sources, al-Tabari and Baladhuri, but a prominent Shi'a theologian Al-Shaykh Al-Mufid states in his account in Kitab al-Irshad that Abbas went to the river together with Husayn but became separated, was surrounded, and killed. At some point, a young child of Husayn's, who was sitting on his lap, was hit by an arrow and died.

==== Death ====
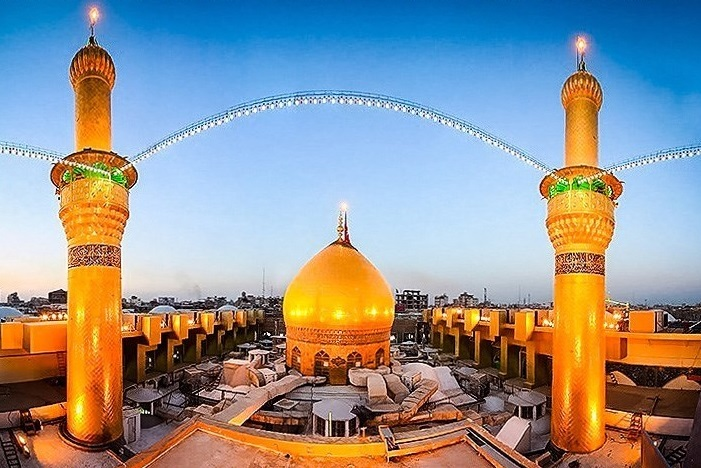
Imam Husayn Shrine, where Husayn is buried, in the 21st century

During the Battle of Karbala the Umayyad soldiers hesitated to initiate a direct attack on Husayn; however, he was struck in the mouth by an arrow as he went to the river to drink. He collected his blood in a cupped hand and cast towards the sky, complaining to God of his suffering. Later, he was surrounded and struck on the head by Malik ibn Nusayr. The blow cut through his hooded cloak, which Husayn removed while cursing his attacker. He put a cap on his head and wrapped a turban around it to staunch the bleeding. Ibn Nusayr seized the bloodied cloak and retreated.

Shimr advanced with a group of foot soldiers towards Husayn, who was now prepared to fight as few people were left on his side. A young boy from Husayn's camp escaped from the tents, ran to him, tried to defend him from a sword stroke and had his arm cut off. Ibn Sa'd approached the tents and Husayn's sister Zaynab complained to him: "'Umar b. Sa'd, will Abu 'Abd Allah (the kunya of Husayn) be killed while you stand and watch?" Ibn Sa'd wept but did nothing. Husayn is said to have killed many of his attackers. The Umayyad forces however were still unwilling to kill him and each of them wanted to leave this to somebody else. Eventually Shimr shouted: "Shame on you! Why are you waiting for the man? Kill him, may your mothers be deprived of you!" The Umayyad soldiers then rushed Husayn and wounded him on his hand and shoulder. He fell on the ground face-down and an attacker named Sinan ibn Anas stabbed and beheaded him.

==== Aftermath ====
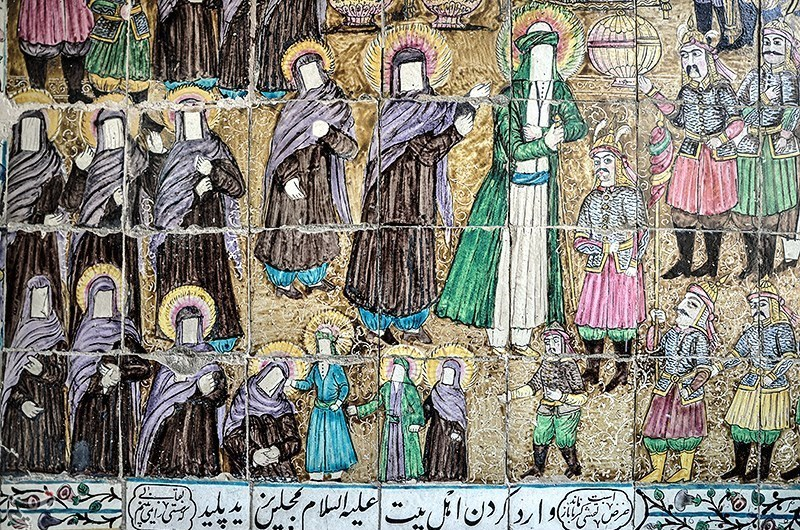
Tilework inside Mu'awin ul-Mulk husayniyya, Kermanshah, Iran, depicting Ali al-Sajjad, Zaynab bint Ali and other prisoners being taken to Yazid's court

Seventy or seventy-two people died on Husayn's side, of whom about twenty were descendants of Abu Talib ibn Abd al-Muttalib, the father of Ali. This included two of Husayn's sons, six of his paternal brothers, three sons of Hasan ibn Ali, three sons of Jafar ibn Abi Talib and three sons and three grandsons of Aqil ibn Abi Talib. Following the battle, Husayn's clothes were stripped, and his sword, shoes and baggage were taken. The women's jewelry and cloaks were also seized. Shimr wanted to kill Husayn's only surviving son Ali al-Sajjad, who had not taken part in the fighting because of illness, but was prevented by Ibn Sa'd. There are reports of more than sixty wounds on Husayn's body, which was then trampled with horses as previously instructed by Ibn Ziyad. The bodies of Husayn's companions were decapitated. There were eighty-eight dead in Ibn Sa'd's army, who were buried before he left. After his departure, members of the Banu Asad tribe, from the nearby village of Ghadiriya, buried the headless bodies of Husayn's companions.

Husayn's family, along with the heads of the dead, were sent to Ibn Ziyad. He poked Husayn's mouth with a stick and intended to kill Ali al-Sajjad, but spared him after the pleas of Husayn's sister Zaynab. The heads and the family were then sent to Yazid, who also poked Husayn's mouth with a stick. The historian Henri Lammens has suggested that this is a duplication of the report regarding Ibn Ziyad. Yazid was compassionate towards the women and Ali Zayn al-Abidin, and cursed Ibn Ziyad for murdering Husayn, stating that had he been there, he would have spared him. One of his courtiers asked for the hand of a captive woman from Husayn's family in marriage, which resulted in heated altercation between Yazid and Zaynab. The women of Yazid's household joined the captive women in their lamentation for the dead. After a few days, the women were compensated for their belongings looted in Karbala and were sent back to Medina.

The killing of the grandson of Muhammad shocked the Muslim community. The image of Yazid suffered and gave rise to sentiment that he was impious. Prior to the Battle of Karbala, the Muslim community was divided into two political factions. Nonetheless, a religious sect with distinct theological doctrines and specific set of rituals had not developed. Karbala gave this early political party of pro-Alids a distinct religious identity and helped transform it into a distinct religious sect. Heinz Halm writes: "There was no religious aspect to Shi'ism prior to 680. The death of the third imam and his followers marked the 'big bang' that created the rapidly expanding cosmos of Shi'ism and brought it into motion."

==== Related uprisings ====
A few prominent Alid supporters in Kufa felt guilty for abandoning Husayn after having invited him to revolt. To atone for what they perceived as their sin, they began a movement known as Tawwabin uprising, under Sulayman ibn Surad, a companion of Muhammad, to fight the Umayyads, and attracted large-scale support. The armies met in January 685 at Battle of Ayn al-Warda; which resulted killing most of them including Ibn Surad.

The defeat of the Tawwabin left the leadership of the Kufan pro-Alids in the hand of Mukhtar al-Thaqafi. In October 685, Mukhtar and his supporters seized Kufa. His control extended to most of Iraq and parts of northwestern Iran. Mukhtar executed Kufans involved in the killing of Husayn, including Ibn Sa'd and Shimr, while thousands of people fled to Basra. He then sent his general Ibrahim ibn al-Ashtar to fight an approaching Umayyad army, led by Ibn Ziyad, which had been sent to reconquer the province. The Umayyad army was routed at the Battle of Khazir in August 686 and Ibn Ziyad was slain. Later on, in April 687, Mukhtar was killed.

==== Historical analysis ====
Based on an official report sent to caliph Yazid, which describes the battle of Karbala very briefly, stating that it lasted for no longer than a siesta, Lammens concludes that there was no battle at all but a quick massacre that was over in an hour; he suggests that the detailed accounts found in the primary sources are Iraqi fabrications, since their writers were dissatisfied with their hero being killed without putting up a fight. This is countered by the historian Laura Veccia Vaglieri, who argues that despite there being some fabricated accounts, all of the contemporary accounts together form "a coherent and credible narrative". She criticizes Lammens' hypothesis as being based on a single isolated report and being devoid of critical analysis. Similarly, Madelung and Wellhausen assert that the battle lasted from sunrise to sunset and that the overall account of the battle is reliable. Vaglieri and Madelung explain the length of the battle despite the numerical disparity between the opposing camps as Ibn Sa'd's attempt to prolong the fight and pressure Husayn into submission instead of attempting to quickly overwhelm and kill him.

According to Wellhausen, the compassion that Yazid showed to the family of Husayn and his cursing of Ibn Ziyad was only for show. He argues that if killing Husayn was a crime its responsibility lay with Yazid and not Ibn Ziyad, who was only performing his duty. Madelung holds a similar view; according to him, early accounts place the responsibility for Husayn's death on Ibn Ziyad instead of Yazid. Yazid, Madelung argues, wanted to end Husayn's opposition, but as a caliph of Islam could not afford to be seen as publicly responsible and so diverted blame onto Ibn Ziyad by hypocritically cursing him. According to Howard, some traditional sources have a tendency to exonerate Yazid at the cost of Ibn Ziyad and lower authorities.

==== Primary and classic sources ====
The primary source of the Karbala narrative is the work of the Kufan historian Abu Mikhnaf titled Kitab Maqtal Al-Husayn. (Note: Other early monographs on the death of Husayn, which have not survived, were written by al-Asbagh al-Nubata, Jabir ibn Yazid al-Ju'fi, Ammar ibn Mu'awiya al-Duhni, Awana ibn al-Hakam, al-Waqidi, Hisham ibn al-Kalbi, Nasr ibn Muzahim, and al-Mada'ini; of these al-Nubta's monograph was perhaps the earliest.) Abu Mikhnaf's was an adult some twenty years after the Battle of Karbala. As such he knew many eyewitnesses and collected firsthand accounts and some with very short chains of transmitters, usually one or two intermediaries. The eyewitnesses were of two kinds: those from Husayn's side and those from Ibn Sa'd's army. Since few people from Husayn's camp survived, most eyewitnesses were from the second category. According to Julius Wellhausen, most of them regretted their actions in the battle and embellished the accounts of the battle in favor of Husayn in order to dilute their guilt. Although as an Iraqi, Abu Mikhnaf had pro-Alid tendencies, his reports generally do not contain much bias on his part. Abu Mikhnaf's original text seems to have been lost and the version extant today has been transmitted through secondary sources such as the History of Prophets and Kings by al-Tabari; and Ansab al-Ashraf by Baladhuri. (Note: Nevertheless, four manuscripts of a Maqtal located at Gotha (No. 1836), Berlin (Sprenger, Nos. 159–160), Leiden (No. 792), and Saint Petersburg (Am No. 78) libraries have been attributed to Abu Mikhnaf.) Tabari quotes either directly from Abu Mikhnaf or from his student Ibn al-Kalbi, who took most of his material from Abu Mikhnaf. Tabari occasionally takes material from Ammar ibn Mu'awiya, Awana and other primary sources, which, however, adds little to the narrative. Baladhuri uses same sources as Tabari. Information on the battle found in the works of Dinawari and Ya'qubi is also based on Abu Mikhnaf's Maqtal, although they occasionally provide some extra notes and verses. Other secondary sources include al-Mas'udi's Muruj al-Dhahab, Ibn A'tham al-Kufi's Kitab al-Futuh, Shaykh al-Mufid's Kitab al-Irshad, and Abu al-Faraj al-Isfahani's Maqatil al-Talibiyyin. Most of these sources took material from Abu Mikhnaf, in addition to some from the primary works of Awana, al-Mada'ini and Nasr ibn Muzahim. Although Tabari and other early sources contain some miraculous stories, these sources are mainly historical and rational in nature, in contrast to the literature of later periods, which is mainly hagiographical in nature.

The Battle of Karbala was also reported by an early Christian source. A history by the Syriac Christian scholar Theophilus of Edessa, who was chief astrologer in the Abbasid court between 775 and 785, is partially preserved in a number of extant Christian chronicles, including those by Michael the Syrian and the Byzantine historian Theophanes the Confessor. (Note: Theophilus's history corroborates the death in battle of Husayn and most of his men at Karbala after suffering from thirst. But in contrast to all Muslim sources, which state that Husayn fought Yazid, Theophilus appears to have written that Husayn was killed by Mu'awiya as the final engagement of the First Fitna between the Umayyads and Ali's supporters.)

== Tomb ==
Husayn ibn Ali's tomb is located in the city of Karbala, about 90 km southwest of Baghdad. This tomb was probably formed two centuries after the event of Karbala and was rebuilt and expanded until the thirteenth century AH. This place did not have a building at first and was marked with a simple sign. After that, in the third century AH, a monument was built on it, which was considered during the time of some Abbasid caliphs and Dailami princes and patriarchal and Ottoman rulers, and over time, the city of Karbala was built and expanded around it.

There are several narrations about the burial place of Imam Husayn's head; For example, with his father Ali in Najaf, outside Kufa but not with Ali, in Karbala with his whole body, in Baqiya, in an unknown place in Damascus, in Raqqa, Syria, and in a mosque Mohsen Al-Amin in Cairo.

== Commemoration ==
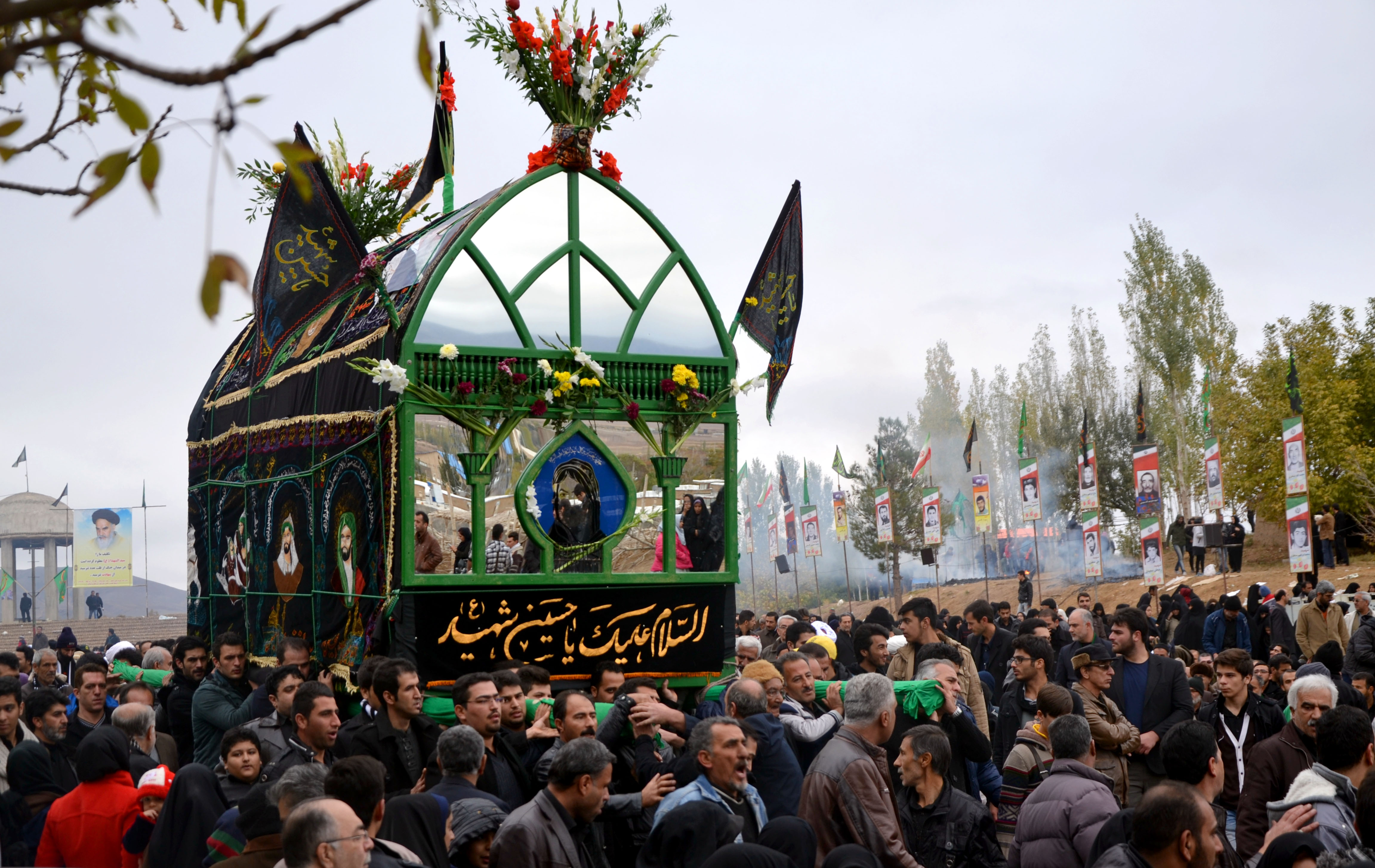
Mourning of Muharram in cities and villages of Iran

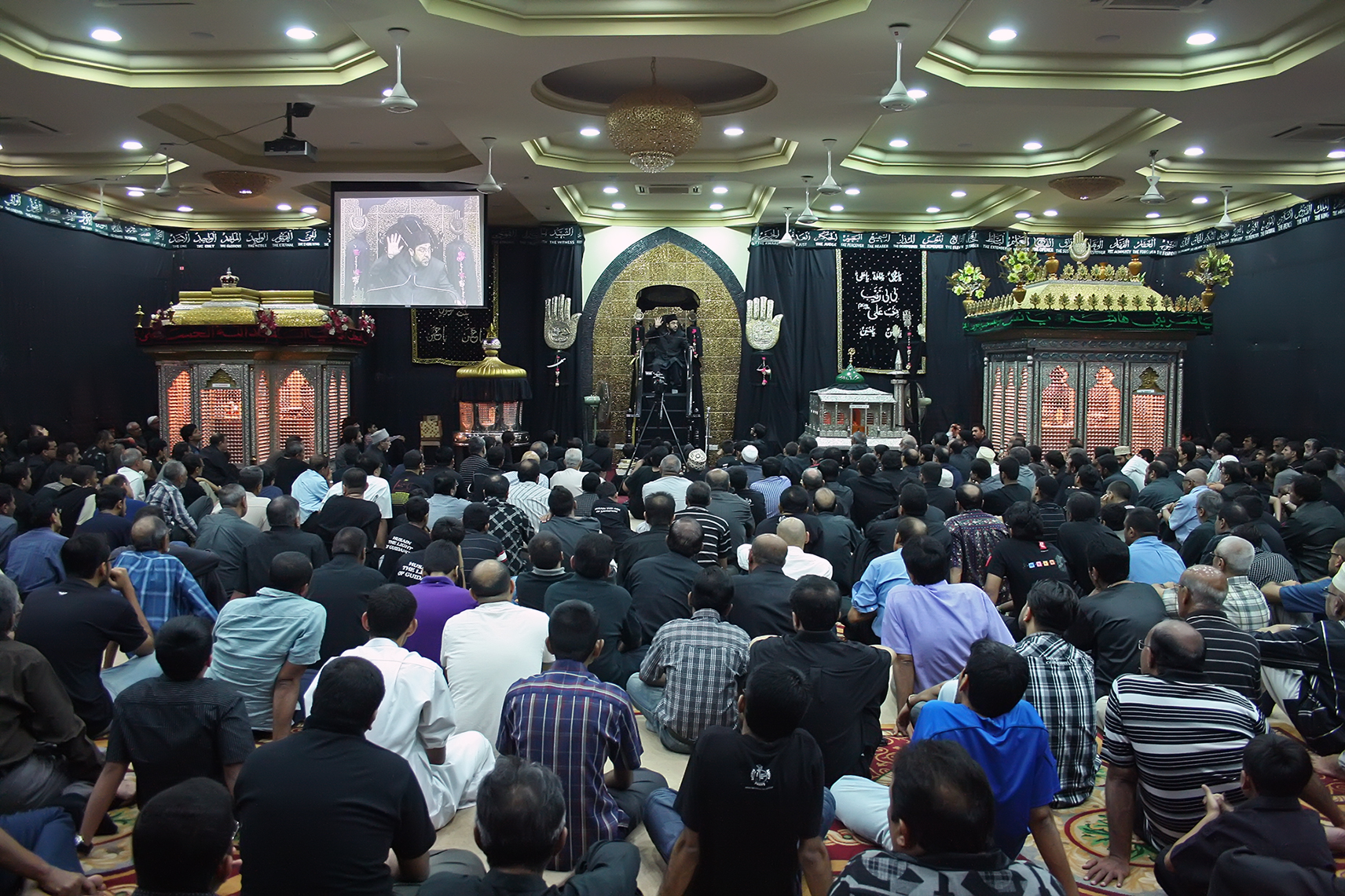
A majlis being held in a husayniyya

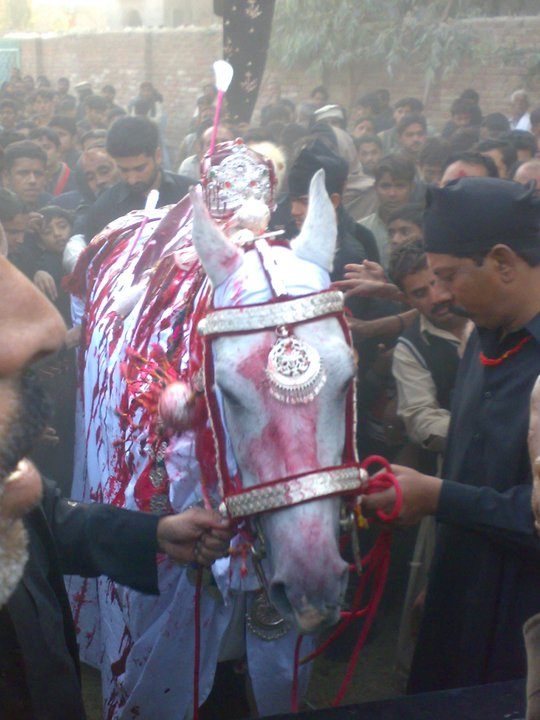
A Zuljenah in a Muaharram procession

Shi'a Muslims consider pilgrimages to Husayn's tomb to be a source of divine blessings and rewards. According to Shi'a tradition the first such visit was performed by Husayn's son Ali al-Sajjad and the surviving family members during their return from Syria to Medina. The first historically recorded visit is Sulayman ibn Surad and the Penitents going to Husayn's grave before their departure to Syria. They are reported to have lamented and beaten their chests and to have spent a night by the tomb. Thereafter this tradition was limited to the Shi'a imams for several decades. before gaining momentum under the sixth Shi'a imam Jafar Sadiq and his followers. Buyids and Safavids also encouraged this practice. Special visits are paid on 10 Muharram (Ashura Pilgrimage) and 40 days after the anniversary of Husayn's (Arba'in pilgrimage). In Shi'a tradition, Husayn's martyrdom is also connected to the hagiography of Yahya (John the Baptist).

The soil of Karbala, is considered to have miraculous healing effects.

Mourning for Husayn is considered by Shi'as to be a source of salvation in the afterlife, and is undertaken as a remembrance of his suffering. After the death of Husayn, when his family was being taken to Ibn Ziyad, Husayn's sister Zaynab is reported to have cried out after seeing his headless body: "O Muhammad!... Here is Husayn in the open, stained with blood and with limbs torn off. O Muhammad! Your daughters are prisoners, your progeny are killed, and the east wind blows dust over them." Shi'a Muslims consider this to be the first instance of wailing and mourning over the death of Husayn. Husayn's son Ali al-Sajjad is reported to have spent the rest of his life weeping for his father. Similarly, Husayn's mother Fatima is believed to be weeping for him in paradise and the weeping of believers is considered to be a way of sharing her sorrows. Special gatherings (majalis; sing. majlis) are arranged in places reserved for this purpose, called husayniyya. In these gatherings the story of Karbala is narrated and various elegies (rawda) are recited by professional reciters (rawda khwan).

During the month of Muharram, elaborate public processions are performed in commemoration of the Battle of Karbala. In contrast to pilgrimage to Husayn's tomb and simple lamenting, these processions do not date back to the time of the battle but arose during tenth century. Their earliest recorded instance was in Baghdad in 963 during the reign of the first Buyid ruler Mu'izz al-Dawla. The processions start from a husayniyya and the participants parade barefoot through the streets, wailing and beating their chests and heads before returning to the husayniyya for a majlis. Sometimes, chains and knives are used to inflict wounds and physical pain. In South Asia, an ornately tacked horse called Zuljenah, representing Husayn's battle horse, is also led riderless through the streets. In Iran, the battle scenes of Karbala are performed on stage in front of an audience in a ritual called ta'ziyeh (passion play), also known as shabih-khani. In India however, tazias refer to the coffins and replicas of Husayn's tomb carried in processions.

Most of these rituals take place during the first ten days of Muharram, reaching a climax on the tenth day, although majalis can also occur throughout the year. Occasionally, especially in the past, some Sunni participation in majalis and processions has been observed. According to Yitzhak Nakash, the rituals of Muharram have an "important" effect in the "invoking the memory of Karbala", as these help consolidate the collective identity and memory of the Shi'a community. Anthropologist Michael Fischer states that commemoration of the Battle of Karbala by the Shi'a is not only the retelling of the story, but also presents them with "life models and norms of behavior" which are applicable to all aspects of life, which he calls the Karbala Paradigm. According to Olmo Gölz, the Karbala Paradigm provide Shi'as with heroic norms and a martyr ethos, and represents an embodiment of the battle between good and evil, justice and injustice. Rituals involving self-flagellation have been criticised by many Shi'a scholars as they are considered to be innovative practices. Iranian supreme leader Ayatollah Ali Khamenei has banned the practice in Iran since 1994.

== Family life ==
Ḥusayn ibn 'Alī
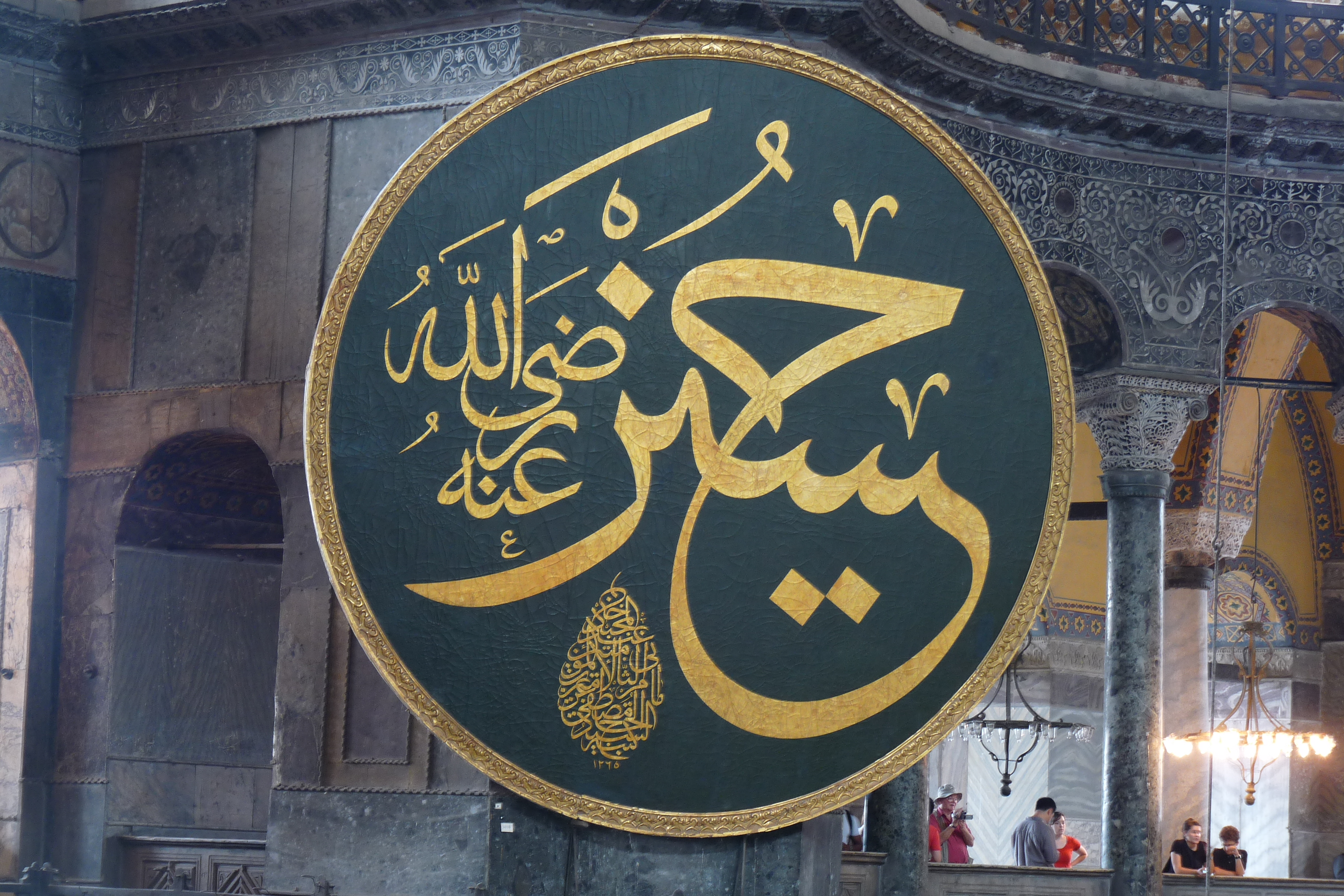
- Calligraphic seal featuring Husayn's name, on display in the Hagia Sophia.

Shiism: Imam; Proof of God, The Martyr of Martyrs, Master of the Martyrs All Islam: Ahl al-Bayt, Ṣaḥābī, Martyr;Master of the Youths of Paradise
- Venerated in: All Islam (Salafis honour rather than venerate him).
- Major shrine: Imam Husayn Shrine, Karbala, Iraq

Husayn's first marriage was with Rubab bint Imra al-Qais. Her father, Imra' al-Qais, a chief of Banu Kalb, came to Medina during the Caliphate of Umar and was appointed by him as the chief of the Quda'a tribes. Ali proposed her marriage with Husayn, but since Husayn and Imra al-Qais's daughter were too young at the time, the actual marriage took place later. Husayn had a daughter, Amena (or Amina or Omayma) who is known as Sakinah, from her. According to a narration recorded by Abu al-Faraj al-Isfahani, Hasan has blamed Husayn for his excessive favors to Rubab. Husayn, in response, depicted his great love for Rubab and Sakinah in three lines of poetry. Later on Rubab bore a son, Abd Allah (or according to recent Shia sources, Ali al-Asghar ibn Husayn) for him. Husayn's kunya, Abu Abd Allah, probably refers to this son. After Husayn's death, Rubab spent a year in grief at his grave and refused to marry again.

According to Madelung, Husayn had two sons named Ali. The older one, Ali al-Sajjad who became the fourth Shia Imam later, was 23 years old when his younger brother (Ali al-Akbar ibn Husayn) was killed in the Battle of Karbala at the age of 19. Ali al-Akbar was born from Layla bint Abi Murrah al-Thaqafi, the daughter of Abi Murrah al-Thaqafi, who was an ally of the Umayyads. Husayn's marriage with Layla, according to Madelung, probably had material benefits for Husayn. Ali al-Sajjad's mother, on the other hand, was a slave probably from Sind named Ḡazāla, Solāfa, Salāma, Šāhzanān, or Shahrbanu. According to the reports, commonly accepted by Shia, she was the daughter of Yazdegerd III, the last Sassanid king of Iran to be captured during the Arab conquest. (Note: Therefore Ali Zayn al-Abidin was considered "the son of the two elect" (ebn al-ḵīaratayn) among the Arabs and the Persians. This is generally accepted by the Shias, but early sources do not confirm it and some genealogists reject it.) On the other hand, in narrative sources, mistakes and confusion have been made between Ali al-Asghar and Abd Allah. Contemporary Shiite circles have carefully identified Sajjad as Ali al-Awsat and Ali al-Asghar as an infant in Karbala; Among these children, Abd Allah – known by the mention of his name in the events of Ashura – is considered the other son of Husayn. According to Madelung, although early Sunni sources refer to Ali al-Sajjad as Ali al-Asghar and Ali II as Ali al-Akbar, it is probably true that Sheikh Mufid and other Shi'ite writers are correct in stating the opposite. Ali II was killed in Karbala at the age of 19. His mother is Layla, the daughter of Abi Murrah ibn Urwah al-Thaqafi and Maymuna bint Abi Sufyan, the sister of Mu'awiya I. According to Madelung, after Hasan's peace with Mu'awiya I, Husayn married Layla, from whom Ali al-Akbar was born.

Umm Ishaq bint Talha ibn Ubayd Allah, the daughter of Talha ibn Ubayd Allah, was another wife of Husayn, who had previously married Hasan. Despite her allegedly bad character, Hasan was pleased with her and asked his younger brother, Husayn, to marry her when he himself died. Husayn did so and had a daughter from her, named Fatima, who later married with Hasan ibn Hasan.

Hasan and Husayn were the only male descendants of the Muhammad through his daughter from whom the next generations were born. Hence, any person who says that his lineage goes back to the Muhammad is either related to Hasan or to Husayn. Hasan and Husayn are different in this respect from their half brothers, such as Muhammad ibn al-Hanafiyya.

== Personality and appearance ==
Husayn had a white face and sometimes wore a green turban and sometimes a black turban. He would travel with the poor or invite them to his house and feed them. Mu'awiya I said about Husayn that he and his father Ali were not deceitful, and Amr ibn al-As considered him the most beloved of the earthlings to the people of heaven.

According to the Encyclopedia of Islam, one of the moral characteristics of Husayn is tolerance, humility, eloquence, and finally traits that can be deduced from his behavior, such as despising death, hatred of a shameful life, pride, and the like. In many narrations, the resemblance of Husayn and his brother to Muhammad is mentioned, and each of them is likened to half of their grandfather's behavior.

Husayn is described as looking like his grandfather, Muhammad, though not as much as his older brother, Hasan. According to Madelung, Husayn was similar to his father, Ali, while Hasan had the temperament of Muhammad and criticized the policies of his father, Ali. Madelung cites the fact that Hasan named two of his sons Muhammad and did not name any of them Ali and that Husayn named two of his four sons Ali and did not name either Muhammad as proof of this claim. Rasool Jafarian considers the narrations in which Husayn is like Ali and Hasan is like Muhammad to be fake; According to him, the image presented in these narrations could have been used to destroy the image of Ali and Ashura and to be useful to those who were in favor of Uthman tendencies. According to the Shia scholar, Muhammad Husayn Tabatabai, the opinion of some commentators about the difference in taste between Hasan and Husayn is misplaced; Because despite not swearing allegiance to Yazid, Husayn, like his brother, spent ten years in Mu'awiya's rule and never opposed it. Mohammad Emadi Haeri believes that Husayn is considered to be similar to Muhammad in most sources, and in one narration the most similar to him. There is also a narration that Ali considers Hussein to be the most similar person in terms of behavior.

Husayn was known for his generosity in Medina, and he freed his slaves and maids if they saw any good behavior. There is a narration that Mu'awiyah sent a maid to Husayn with a lot of property and clothes. When the maid recited verses from the Qur'an and a poem about the instability of the world and the death of man, Husayn set her free and gave her property. Once one of Husayn's slaves did something wrong. But after the slave recited part of Quran 3:134 (Arabic: وَالْعافینَ عَنِ النَّاس, romanized: wa-al-‘āfīna ‘ani al-nās, lit. 'and those who forgive people') Husayn forgave him and after that the slave recited the rest of the verse (Arabic: وَلِلَّهِ یُحِبُّ الْمُحسنِينَ, romanized: wa-Allahu yuḥibbu al-muḥsinīn, lit. 'and God loves doers of good'), and so Husayn manumitted him. There is a narration that Husayn gave the property and goods that he inherited before receiving them. Husayn gave his children's teacher a large sum of money and clothes; While acknowledging that this does not compensate for the value of the teacher's work. A Levantine man once cursed Husayn and Ali, but Husayn forgave him and treated him with kindness. It is said that the place of the food bags that Husayn carried for the poor was obvious on his body on the day of Ashura.

== In the Quran and Hadith ==
=== In the verses of the Quran ===
Many Sunni and Shia'a commentators, such as Fakhr Razi and Muhammad Husayn Tabataba'i, in their interpretation of Surah Al-Insan, attribute its revelation to Ali and Fatima and the story of the illness of their child or children and a vow for their recovery.

In interpreting the verse of purification in Al-Mizan, Tabatabai considers the addressee of this verse to be the Ahl al-Kisa and refers to its hadiths, which number more than seventy hadiths and are mostly from the Sunnis. Sunni commentators such as Fakhr Razi and Ibn Kathir, in their commentary, while narrating various narrations about the example of Ahl al-Bayt in this verse, consider Ali, Fatima, Hasan and Husayn as examples.

Another example is verse 3:61 of the Quran. After an inconclusive debate about Jesus with a Christian delegation from Najran in 10/631–2, it was decided to engage in mubuhala, where both parties would pray to invoke God's curse upon whoever was the liar. This is when Muhammad is reported to have received verse 3:61 of the Quran, also known as the verse of mubahala. Madelung argues that 'our sons' in the verse of mubahala must refer to Muhammad's grandchildren, Hasan and Husayn. In that case, he continues, it would be reasonable to also include in the event their parents, Ali and Fatima. Madelung writes that their inclusion by Muhammad in this significant ritual must have raised the religious rank of his family. A similar view is voiced by Lalani.

In the explanation and interpretation of verse 23 of Surah ash-Shura, Tabatabai in Al-Mizan, while reporting and criticizing the various sayings of the commentators, has said that the meaning of "nearness" is the love of the Ahl al-Bayt of Muhammad; That is, Ali is Fatima, Hassan and Husayn. He goes on to cite various narrations from Sunnis and Shiites that have clarified this issue. Sunni commentators such as Fakhr al-Razi and Ibn Kathir have also referred to this issue.

Verse 15 of Surah Al-Ahqaf talks about a pregnant woman who endures a lot of pain and suffering. This verse is considered a reference to Fatima Zahra, and the son is also known as Husayn, when God expressed his condolences to Muhammad about the fate of this grandson and Muhammad expressed this to Fatima Zahra, she was very upset.

Other verses that the Shiites attribute to Husayn include verse 6 of Surah Al-Ahzab and 28 of Surah Az-Zukhruf, which have been interpreted to mean the continuation of the Imamate from his generation. Also, verses such as 77 Surah an-Nisa, 33 Surah al-Isra and 27th to 30th Surah Al-Fajr refer to the uprising and killing of Husayn from the Shiite point of view.

=== In the biography of Muhammad ===
Husayn is placed as an example for the second weight in the narrations related to "Thaqalin". In another group of narrations related to Hasnain, they are introduced as "the master of the youth of Paradise". His name and Hassan's, due to their young age, are among those who pledge allegiance in renewing allegiance to Muhammad, which indicates Muhammad's goal in strengthening their historical and social status.

==== News of Husayn's fate ====
There are narrations that Gabriel informed Muhammad at the time of Husayn's birth that his ummah would kill Husayn and that the Imamate would be from Husayn, and that Muhammad informed his companions of how Husayn had been killed. Except for Muhammad, Ali and Hasan, they had said the same thing. God also informed the previous prophets about the killing of Husayn. Ali also knew that Husayn would be killed in Karbala, and once he passed by this area, he stopped and cried and remembered the news of Muhammad. He interpreted Karbala (کربلا) as (کرب) anguish and (بلا) calamity. The slain of Karbala will enter Paradise without any reckoning.

== Works ==
There are narrations, sermons and letters left from Husayn Ibn Ali which are available in Sunni and Shiite sources. Narrations about him can be divided into two periods before and after the Imamate. In the first period – which is the period of his life in the life of his grandfather, father, mother and brother – there are at least two types of narrations about him: first, his narrations from his relatives, and second, his personal hadiths. In Sunni sources, only the aspect of the narration of his hadith has been considered in these hadiths. These musnads, like the musnad of the companions of Muhammad, also have a musnad named Husayn Ibn Ali. In his musnad, Abu Bakr Bazar has narrated the musnad of Husayn Ibn Ali with 4 hadiths and Tabarani has narrated his musnad with 27 hadiths, respectively. In the musnad of Husayn ibn Ali, in addition to the hadiths of Husayn himself, there are also hadiths of Muhammad and Ali ibn Abi Talib. In the present era, Azizullah Atardi has compiled the document of the Imam of the Martyr Abi Abdullah Al-Husayn Ibn Ali.

In the category of sermons of Husayn Ibn Ali, there are some sermons of him in the pre-Imamate period, some of which are very famous. Thus, the sermon of Husayn ibn Ali, after public allegiance to Ali ibn Abi Talib and others, is his sermon in the battle of Safin. Another example is a poem by Husayn about the loss of his brother Hasan after his burial. The sermons and letters of Husayn ibn Ali during his Imamate are more than before him. His letters to the Shiites, as well as his letters to Mu'awiyah regarding his adherence to the peace treaty, trace Mu'awiyah's actions, especially regarding Yazid, as well as his sermons and letters in the form of letters of recommendation at the beginning of Yazid's caliphate. An important part of the sermons and letters belong to the period of the uprising of Husayn bin Ali. Correspondence with Kufis, Basrians and people like Muslim Ibn Aqeel is like this. Hadiths on the subjects of jurisprudence, interpretation, beliefs, rulings and sermons, supplications, advice and poetry also remain from Husayn, which are scattered in Shiite and Sunni sources and have been compiled and published in the form of collections. There are also prayers left by Husayn Ibn Ali which have been published in the form of collections entitled Al-Sahifa Al-Husayn or prays of Imam Al-Husayn.

One of the most famous Shia prayers, as well as the works of Husayn, recorded in the book, Mafatih al-Janan, is the Du'a Arafah. According to William C. Chittick, this prayer is the most famous prayer in terms of its beauty and spiritual structure and is recited every year on the Day of Arafah and during the Hajj season – that is, when it was first recited by Husayn ibn Ali – by Shia pilgrims. This prayer has a special and important role in Shia theology and Mulla Sadra, the philosopher and mystic, has referred to this prayer many times in his works.

== Views ==
The killing of Husayn has had an emotional impact on Sunnis, who remember the event as a tragic incident and those killed in the company of Husayn as martyrs. The impact on Shi'a Islam has been much deeper. According to Vaglieri, only the adherents of the Umayyad who considered him as "a rebel against the established authority", condoned his murder by Yazid, but their opinion was opposed by the majority of Muslims. Therefore, almost all Muslims consider Husayn honorable because he was the grandson of Muhammad and because of the belief that he sacrificed himself for an ideal. Historian Edward Gibbon described the events at Karbala as a tragedy. According to historian Syed Akbar Hyder, Mahatma Gandhi attributed the historical progress of Islam, to the "sacrifices of Muslim saints like Husayn" rather than military force.

=== Sunnis ===
The positive attitude of the Sunnis towards Husayn, according to Vaglieri, is most likely due to the sad narrations that Abu Mikhnaf has collected, some of which have been narrated directly or with short chains of transmitters, mostly from Kufis who regretted their actions towards Husayn. These sad narrations of the Kufis, which were a sign of Abu Mikhnaf's Shia tendencies, became the source of the narrations used by later historians and spread throughout the Islamic world. According to Rasul Jafarian, the Shia historian, fatalism, being promoted by Mu'awiya, caused Husayn's move to never be considered an uprising against corruption by the Sunnis, and they only considered it an illegal insurrection (Fitna).

=== Shias ===
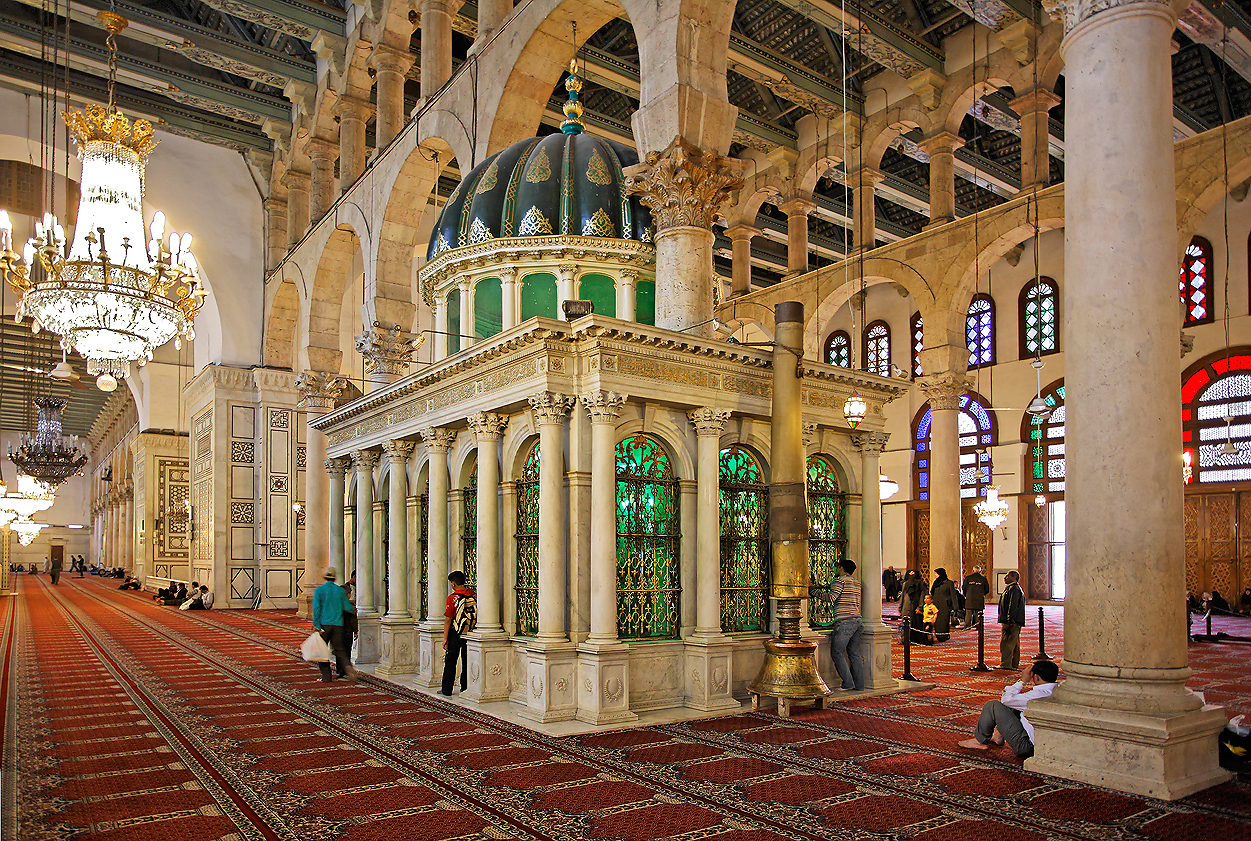
Like Al-Husain, Yahya (John the Baptist) was reportedly beheaded, and his head is considered to be buried here, in what is now the Umayyad Mosque in Damascus, Syria

The most important components of Shia views about Husayn are the belief in the Imamate of Husayn and the characteristics of an Imam by the Shia religions; Twelvers, Ismailis and Zaydis. Like other Imams, Husayn is a mediator with God for those who call on him; "it is through his intercession (Tawassul) that his faithful followers obtain guidance and attain salvation."

As a member of holy five, he receives all the divine grace that exist in his older brother, Hasan, also as the grandson of Muhammad. According to Vaglieri, the basis of the Shias' glorification of Husayn is his outstanding sacred and moral action and the noble ideals to which he sacrificed himself. From the belief that "the Imams know all that was, that is, and that is to come, and that their knowledge does not increase with time", it is inferred that Husayn already knew the fate that awaited him and his followers. Hence, he left Mecca for Kufa, aware of his imminent sacrifice and yet without any hesitation or attempt to escape the will of God. A narration according to which Husayn was called by God to choose between sacrifice and Victory (with the help of an angel), gives even more value to his enterprise. About the reason for Husayn's sacrifice in Shia sources Vaglieri write:

Husayn gave his person and his possessions as an offering to God to "revive the religion of his grandfather Muhammad", "to redeem it", and "save it from the destruction into which it had been thrown by the behaviour of Yazid"; furthermore, he wished to show that the conduct of the hypocrites was shameful and to teach the peoples the necessity of revolt against unjust and impious governments (fasiks), in short he offered himself as an example (uswa) to the Muslim community.

He is thus remembered as the prince of martyrs (Sayyed al-Shuhada).

The historian G. R. Hawting describes the Battle of Karbala as a "supreme" example of "suffering and martyrdom" for Shi'as. According to Abdulaziz Sachedina, it is seen by Shi'as the climax of suffering and oppression, revenge for which came to be one of the primary goals of many Shi'a uprisings. This revenge is believed to be one of the fundamental objectives of the future revolution of the twelfth Shi'a Imam Muhammad al-Mahdi, whose return is awaited. With his return, Husayn and his seventy-two companions are expected to be resurrected along with their killers, who will then be punished.

Believing that Husayn wanted to redeem people from their sins with his blood, and that his action was "a redemptive sacrifice for the salvation of the world", according to Vaglieri, is foreign to Shia belief; however it may have been penetrated to Shia ta'ziyeh and recent poems later on, since it is easy to make the transition from tawassul to this idea, or it may be influenced by Christian ideas.

Among the verses that interpreted by some Shia sources as referring to Husayn is (Qur'an 46:15) which talks about a pregnant mother, Fatima, the mother of Husayn, who suffers a lot, when God expressed his condolences to Muhammad about the fate of this grandson, and Muhammad expressed this to Fatima; thus she was very upset.

According to another narration, the mysterious letters of K.H.Y.A.S. at the beginning of the nineteenth chapter of the Qur'an (Maryam (surah)) refers to Husayn and his fate in Karbala, that was similar to the fate of Yahya (John the Baptist), who was also beheaded and his head was placed on a plate. It is also narrated that Ali knew that Husayn would be killed in Karbala, and when he passed by this area, he stopped and cried, remembering Muhammad's prophecy. Ali interpreted the name "Karbala" as "Karb" and "bala" meaning "affliction" and "trial". The slain of Karbala will enter Paradise without any reckoning.

The traditional narration "Every day is Ashura and every land is Karbala!" is used by the Shi'a as a mantra to live their lives as Husayn did on Ashura, i.e. with complete sacrifice for God and for others. The saying is also intended to signify that what happened on Ashura in Karbala must always be remembered as part of suffering everywhere.

==== Husayn's head in Isma'ilism ====
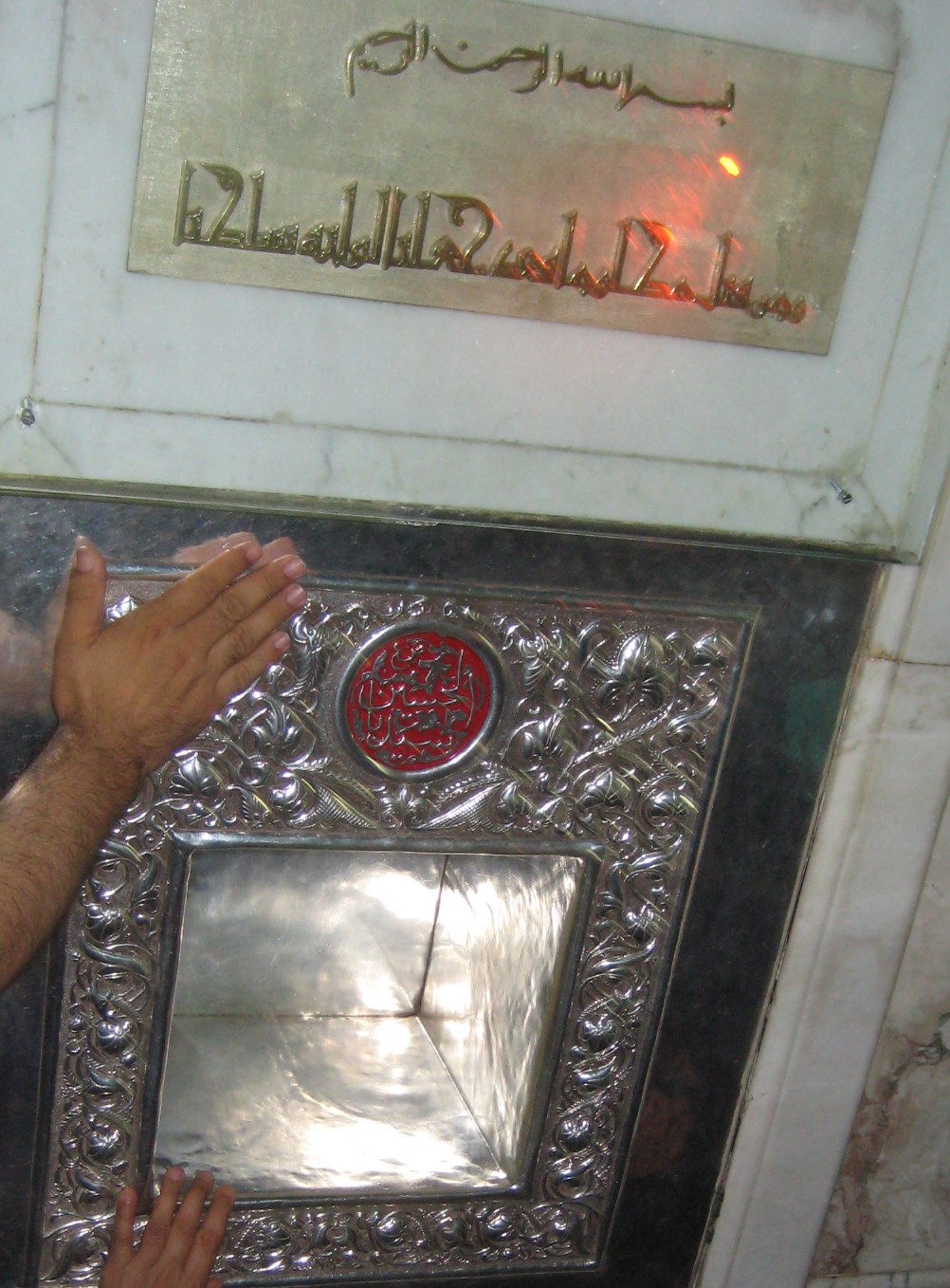
Niche for Husayn's head at the Umayyad Mosque in Damascus

The Fatimid vizier Badr al-Jamali conquered Palestine under Caliph al-Mustansir Billah and discovered the head of Husayn in AH 448 (1056). He constructed the minbar, a mosque and the mashhad at the place of burial, known as the Shrine of Husayn's Head. The shrine was described as the most magnificent building in Ashkelon. During the British Mandate it was a "large maqam on top of a hill" with no tomb but a fragment of a pillar showing the place where the head had been buried. Israeli Defense Forces under Moshe Dayan blew up Mashhad Nabi Husayn in July 1950 as part of a broader operation. Around the year 2000, Isma'ilis from India built a marble platform there, on the grounds of the Barzilai Medical Center. The head remained buried in Ashkelon until 1153 (for about 250 years) only. Fearing the crusaders, Ashkelon's ruler Sayf al-Mamlaka Tamim brought the head to Cairo on 31 August 1153 (8 Jumada II AH 548).

=== Ahl-e Haqq ===
In the holy text of Yarsanism named Zolāl Zolāl is a long dialogue between angels Ruchiyar and Ayvat and their reincarnations. It is written in the book that the angel Ayvat incarnated into Husayn ibn Ali and after his death into a Yari saint named Baba Yadegar.

=== Modern historical views on motivations of Husayn ===
Vaglieri considers him to be motivated by ideology, saying that if the materials that have come down to us are authentic, they convey an image of person who is "convinced that he was in the right, stubbornly determined to achieve his ends..." Holding a similar view, Madelung has argued that Husayn was not a "reckless rebel" but a religious man motivated by pious convictions. According to him, Husayn was convinced that "the family of the Prophet was divinely chosen to lead the community founded by Moḥammad, as the latter had been chosen, and had both an inalienable right and an obligation to seek this leadership." He was, however, not seeking martyrdom and wanted to return when his expected support did not materialize. Maria Dakake holds that Husayn considered the Umayyad rule oppressive and misguided, and revolted to reorient the Islamic community in the right direction. A similar view is held by Mahmoud M. Ayoub. Husain Mohammad Jafri proposes that Husayn, although motivated by ideology, did not intend to secure leadership for himself. Husayn, Jafri asserts, was from the start aiming for martyrdom in order to jolt the collective conscience of the Muslim community and reveal what he considers to be the oppressive and anti-Islamic nature of the Umayyad regime.

Others such as Wellhausen and Lammens, view his revolt as premature and ill-prepared, while others like Heinz Halm see it as a struggle for political leadership among the second generation of Muslims. Fred Donner, G. R. Hawting, and Hugh N. Kennedy consider Husayn's revolt an attempt to regain what his brother Hasan had renounced."

== Legacy ==
=== Politics ===
The first political use of the death of Husayn seems to have been during the revolt of Mukhtar, when he seized Kufa under the slogan of "Revenge for Husayn". Although the Penitents had used the same slogan, they do not seem to have had a political program. In order to enhance their legitimacy, Abbasid rulers claimed to have avenged the death of Husayn by dethroning the Umayyads. During the early years of their rule, they also encouraged Muharram rituals. Buyids, a Shi'a dynasty originally from Iran which later occupied the Abbasid capital Baghdad while accepting the Abbasid caliph's suzerainty, promoted the public rituals of Muharram to portray themselves as patrons of religion and to strengthen the Shi'a identity in Iraq. After taking over Iran in 1501, Safavids, who were previously a Sufi order, declared the state religion to be Twelver Shi'ism. In this regard, Karbala and Muharram rituals came to be a vehicle of Safavid propaganda and a means of consolidating the dynasty's Shi'a identity. Riza Yildirim has claimed that the impetus of the Safvid revolution was the revenge of the death of Husayn. The founder of the dynasty, Shah Ismail, considered himself to be the Mahdi (the twelfth Shi'a Imam) or his forerunner. Similarly, Qajars also patronised Muharram rituals such as processions, taziya and majalis, to improve the relationship between the state and the public.

==== Iranian Revolution ====
Karbala and Shi'a symbolism played a significant role in the Iranian Revolution of 1979. In contrast to the traditional view of Shi'ism as a religion of suffering, mourning and political quietism, Shi'a Islam and Karbala were given a new interpretation in the period preceding the revolution by rationalist intellectuals and religious revisionists like Jalal Al-e-Ahmad, Ali Shariati and Nematollah Salehi Najafabadi. According to these, Shi'ism was an ideology of revolution and political struggle against tyranny and exploitation, and the Battle of Karbala and the death of Husayn was to be seen as a model for revolutionary struggle; weeping and mourning was to be replaced by political activism to realise the ideals of Husayn.

After the White Revolution reforms of the Iranian Shah Mohammad Reza Pahlavi, which were opposed by the Iranian clergy and others, Ruhollah Khomeini labelled the Shah as the Yazid of his time. Shi'i beliefs and symbols were instrumental in orchestrating and sustaining widespread popular resistance with Husayn's story providing a framework for labeling as evil and reacting against the Pahlavi Shah.

Condemning the Iranian monarchy, Khomeini wrote: "The struggle of al-Husayn at Karbalâ is interpreted in the same way as a struggle against the non-Islamic principle of monarchy." Opposition to the Shah was thus compared with the opposition of Husayn to Yazid, and Muharram ritual gatherings became increasingly political in nature. According to Aghaie, the Shah's hostility towards various Muharram rituals, which he considered to be uncivilized, contributed to his fall. The Islamic republic that was established after the revolution has since promoted Muharram rituals. The clerics encourage public participation in elections as a form of "political activism" comparable to that of Husayn. Martyrdom spirit influenced by the death of Husayn was frequently witnessed in Iranian troops during the Iran–Iraq war.

== In art and literature ==
=== Literature ===
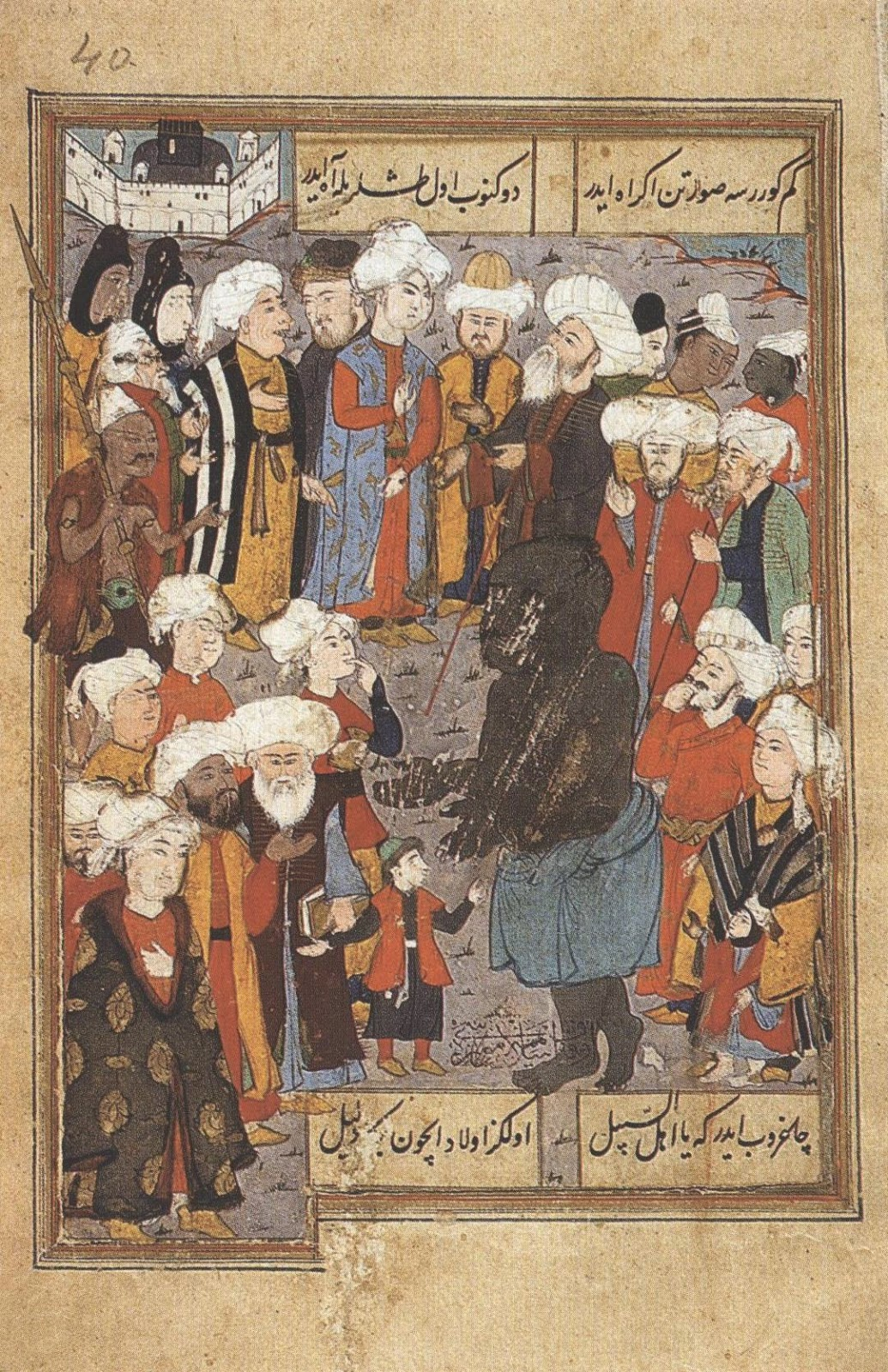
Cameleer telling people about the events he witnessed at Karbala

Mir Mosharraf Hossain's 19th-century novel on Karbala, Bishad Sindhu (the Ocean of Sorrow), established the precedent of the Islamic epic in Bangali literature. South Asian philosopher and poet Muhammad Iqbal sees Husayn's sacrifice as being similar to that of Ishmael and compares Yazid's opposition to Husayn with the opposition of Pharaoh to Moses. Urdu poet Ghalib compares Husayn's suffering with that of Mansur al-Hallaj, a tenth century Sufi, who was executed on a charge of claiming divinity.

==== Maqtal literature and legendary accounts ====
Maqtal (pl. Maqatil) works narrate the story of someone's death. Although Maqatil on the deaths of Ali, Uthman and various others have been written, the Maqtal genre has focused mainly on the story of Husayn's death.

As well as Abu Mikhnaf's Maqtal, other Arabic Maqatil on Husayn were written. Most of these mix history with legend and have elaborate details on Husayn's miraculous birth, which is stated to be on 10 Muharram, coinciding with his date of death. The universe as well as humanity are described as having been created on the day of Ashura (10 Muharram). Ashura is also asserted to have been the day of both Abraham's and Muhammad's birth and of the ascension of Jesus to heaven, and of numerous other events concerning prophets. Husayn is claimed to have performed various miracles, including quenching his companions' thirst by putting his thumb in their mouths and satisfying their hunger by bringing down food from the heavens, and to have killed several thousand Umayyad attackers. Other accounts claim that when Husayn died, his horse shed tears and killed many Umayyad soldiers; the sky became red and it rained blood; angels, jinns and wild animals wept; that light emanated from Husayn's severed head and that it recited the Qur'an; and that all of his killers met calamitous end.

Maqtal later entered Persian, Turkish, and Urdu literature and inspired the development of rawda.

==== Marthiya and rawda ====
When Shi'ism became the official religion of Iran in the 16th century, Safavid rulers such as Shah Tahmasp I patronised poets who wrote about the Battle of Karbala. The genre of marthiya (poems in the memory of the dead, with popular forms of Karbala related marthiya being rawda and nawha), according to Persian scholar Wheeler Thackston, "was particularly cultivated by the Safavids." Various Persian authors wrote texts retelling romanticized and synthesized versions of the battle and events from it, including Sa'id al-Din's Rawdat al-Islam (The Garden of Islam) and Al-Khawarazmi's Maqtal nur 'al-'a'emmah (The Site of the Murder of the Light of the Imams). These influenced the composition of the more popular text Rawdat al-Shuhada (Garden of Martyrs), which was written in 1502 by Husain Wa'iz Kashefi. Kashefi's composition was an effective factor in the development of rawda khwani, a ritual recounting of the battle events in majalis.

Inspired by Rawdat al-Shuhada, the Azerbaijani poet Fuzûlî wrote an abridged and simplified version of it in Ottoman Turkish in his work Hadiqat al-Su'ada. It influenced similar works in Albanian on the subject. Dalip Frashëri's Kopshti i te Mirevet is the earliest, and longest epic so far, written in the Albanian language; the Battle of Karbala is described in detail and Frashëri eulogises those who fell as martyrs, in particular Husayn.

Urdu marthiya is predominantly religious in nature and usually concentrates on lamenting the Battle of Karbala. South Indian rulers of Bijapur (Ali Adil Shah) and Golkonda Sultanate (Muhammad Quli Qutb Shah) were patrons of poetry and encouraged Urdu marthiya recitation in Muharram. Urdu marthiya afterwards became popular throughout India. Famous Urdu poets Mir Taqi Mir, Mirza Rafi Sauda, Mir Anees, and Mirza Salaamat Ali Dabeer have also composed marthiya. Comparing Karl Marx with Husayn, Josh Malihabadi argues that Karbala is not a story of the past to be recounted by the religious clerics in majalis, but should be seen as a model for revolutionary struggle towards the goal of a classless society and economic justice.

==== Sufi poetry ====
In Sufism, where annihilation of the self (nafs) and suffering in the path of God are paramount principles, Husayn is seen as a model Sufi. Persian Sufi poet Hakim Sanai describes Husayn as a martyr, higher in rank than all the other martyrs of the world; while Farid ud-Din Attar considers him a prototype of a Sufi who sacrificed himself in the love of God. Jalal ud-Din Rumi describes Husayn's suffering at Karbala as a means to achieve union with the divine, and hence considers it to be a matter of jubilation rather than grief. Sindhi Sufi poet Shah Abdul Latif Bhittai devoted a section in his Shah Jo Risalo to the death of Husayn, in which the incident is remembered in laments and elegies. He too sees Husayn's death as a sacrifice made in the path of God and condemns Yazid as being bereft of divine love. Turkish Sufi Yunus Emre labels Husayn, along with his brother Hasan, as the "fountain head of the martyrs" and "Kings of the Paradise" in his songs.

== Ancestry ==
Ancestors of Husayn ibn Ali

8. Abd al-Muttalib ibn Hashim
4. Abu Talib ibn Abd al-Muttalib
9. Fatima bint Amr
2. Ali ibn Abi Talib
10. Asad ibn Hashim
5. Fatimah bint Asad
11. Fatima bint Qays
1. Husayn ibn Ali
12. Abdullah ibn Abd al-Muttalib
6. Muhammad
13. Amina bint Wahb
3. Fatima bint Muhammad
14. Khuwaylid ibn Asad
7. Khadija bint Khuwaylid
15. Fatima bint Za'idah

== See also ==
- Arba'een Pilgrimage
- Zuljanah, Husayn's horse
- Who is Hussain?
- The Hussaini Encyclopedia
- Al-Tall Al-Zaynabiyya
- Mokhtarnameh
- Twelver Shia holy days

== Bibliography ==
=== Books ===
- Schimmel, Annemarie (1975). Mystical Dimensions of Islam. Chapel Hill: The University of North Carolina Press. ISBN 978-0-8078-1271-6.
- Howard-Johnston, James (2010). Witnesses to a World Crisis - Historians and Histories of the Middle East in the Seventh Century. Oxford: Oxford University Press. ISBN 978-0-19-920859-3. Archived from the original on 10 October 2023.
- Chittick, William C. (1986). "Rūmī's view of the Imam Ḥusayn". Al-Serāt: Papers from the Imam Ḥusayn Conference. Imam Ḥusayn Conference. Vol. 12. London: The Muhammadi Trust of Great Britain and Northern Ireland. pp. 3–12. ISBN 9780710302076.
- Haywood, J. A. (1991). "Marthiya in Urdu literature". In Bosworth, C. E.; van Donzel, E. & Pellat, Ch. (eds.). The Encyclopaedia of Islam, Second Edition. Volume VI: Mahk–Mid. Leiden: E. J. Brill. pp. 610–612. ISBN 978-90-04-08112-3.
- Elsie, Robert (2005). Albanian Literature - A Short History. London & New York: I.B. Tauris. ISBN 9781845110314. Archived from the original on 6 March 2023.
- Norris, H. T. (1993). Islam in the Balkans - Religion and Society Between Europe and the Arab World. Columbia, SC: University of South Carolina Press. ISBN 9780872499775.
- Hanaway, W. L. Jr. (1991). "Marthiya in Persian literature". In Bosworth, C. E.; van Donzel, E. & Pellat, Ch. (eds.). The Encyclopaedia of Islam, Second Edition. Volume VI: Mahk–Mid. Leiden: E. J. Brill. pp. 608–609. ISBN 978-90-04-08112-3.
- Thackston, Wheeler M. (1994). A Millennium of Classical Persian Poetry - A Guide to the Reading & Understanding of Persian Poetry from the Tenth to the Twentieth Century. Bethesda: IBEX Publishers. ISBN 9780936347509. Archived from the original on 10 October 2023.
- Sindawi, Khalid (2002). "The image of Ḥusayn ibn Alī in Maqātil Literature". Quaderni di Studi Arabi. 20–21: 79–104. JSTOR 25802958.
- Günther, Sebastian (1994). "Maqâtil Literature in Medieval Islam". Journal of Arabic Literature. 25 (3): 192–212. doi:10.1163/157006494X00103.
- Schimmel, Annemarie (1986). "Karbalā' and the Imam Husayn in Persian and Indo-Muslim literature". Al-Serāt - Papers from the Imam Ḥusayn Conference. Imam Ḥusayn Conference. Vol. 12. London: The Muhammadi Trust of Great Britain and Northern Ireland. pp. 29–39. ISBN 9780710302076.
- Chaudhuri, Supriya (2012). "The Bengali novel". In Dalmia, Vasudha; Sadana, Rashmi (eds.). The Cambridge Companion to Modern Indian Culture. Cambridge, England: Cambridge University Press. ISBN 978-0-521-51625-9. Archived from the original on 10 October 2023.
- Fischer, Michael M. J. (2003). Iran - From Religious Dispute to Revolution. Madison, WI: The University of Wisconsin Press. ISBN 9780299184735. Archived from the original on 10 October 2023.
- Yildirim, Riza (2015). "In the Name of Hosayn's Blood - The Memory of Karbala as Ideological Stimulus to the Safavid Revolution". Journal of Persianate Studies. 8 (2): 127–154. doi:10.1163/18747167-12341289.
- Arjomand, Saïd A. (2016). Sociology of Shi'ite Islam - Collected Essays. Leiden: Brill Publishers. ISBN 9789004326279. Archived from the original on 10 October 2023.
- Kennedy, Hugh (2004) [1986]. The Prophet and the Age of the Caliphates: The Islamic Near East from the 6th to the 11th Century (Second ed.). Harlow: Longman. ISBN 978-0-582-40525-7.
- Anthony, Sean (2011). The Caliph and the Heretic - Ibn Saba and the Origins of Shī'ism. Leiden: Brill Publishers. ISBN 978-90-04-21606-8. Archived from the original on 10 October 2023.
- Sharon, Moshe (1983). Black Banners from the East - The Establishment of the 'Abbāsid State - Incubation of a Revolt. Jerusalem: Jerusalem Studies in Arabic and Islam. ISBN 978-965-223-501-5. Archived from the original on 10 October 2023.
- Hyder, Syed Akbar (2006). Reliving Karbala: Martyrdom in South Asian Memory. Oxford: Oxford University Press. ISBN 978-0-19-537302-8. Archived from the original on 10 October 2023.
- Brunner, Rainer (2013). "Karbala". In Bowering, Gerhard; Crone, Patricia; Mirza, Mahan; Kadi, Wadad; Zaman, Muhammad Qasim; Stewart, Devin J. (eds.). The Princeton Encyclopedia of Islamic Political Thought. New Jersey: Princeton University Press. p. 293. ISBN 9780691134840. Archived from the original on 10 October 2023.
- Gölz, Olmo (2019). "Martyrdom and Masculinity in Warring Iran - The Karbala Paradigm, the Heroic, and the Personal Dimensions of War". Behemoth - A Journal on Civilisation. 12 (1): 35–51. doi:10.6094/behemoth.2019.12.1.1005.
- Pinault, David (2001). Horse of Karbala - Muslim Devotional Life in India. New York: Palgrave. ISBN 978-1-349-61982-5. Archived from the original on 10 October 2023.
- Aghaie, Kamran S. (2004). The Martyrs of Karbala - Shi'i Symbols and Rituals in Modern Iran. Seattle & London: University of Washington Press. ISBN 978-0-295-98455-1. Archived from the original on 10 October 2023.
- Sachedina, Abdulaziz A. (1981). Islamic Messianism - The Idea of Mahdi in Twelver Shi'ism. Albany, NY: State University of New York Press. ISBN 978-0-87395-442-6. Archived from the original on 10 October 2023.
- Calmard, Jean (1982). "Abbās b. Alī b. Abū Ṭāleb". Encyclopaedia Iranica. Vol. 1. Encyclopædia Iranica Foundation. Archived from the original on 23 September 2018.
- Hawting, Gerald R. (2000). The First Dynasty of Islam: The Umayyad Caliphate AD 661–750 (Second ed.). London and New York: Routledge. ISBN 0-415-24072-7.
- Jafarian, Rasul (1999). Tarikh-e Siasi-e Eslam (in Persian). Vol. 2. Oom: Daftar-e Nashr-e al-Hadi. ISBN 964-400-107-9.
- Chittick, William C. (2012). In Search of the Lost Heart - Explorations in Islamic Thought. New York: SUNY Press. ISBN 978-1438439372.
- Hawting, Gerald R. (2002). "Yazid (I) b. Mu'awiya". In Bearman, P. J.; Bianquis, Th.; Bosworth, C. E.; van Donzel, E. & Heinrichs, W. P. (eds.). The Encyclopaedia of Islam, Second Edition. Volume XI: W–Z. Leiden: E. J. Brill. ISBN 978-90-04-12756-2.
- Donner, Fred M. (2010). Muhammad and the Believers, at the Origins of Islam. Cambridge, MA: Harvard University Press. ISBN 978-0-674-05097-6. Archived from the original on 10 October 2023.
- Dixon, Abd al-Ameer A. (1971). The Umayyad Caliphate, 65-86/684-705: (a Political Study). London: Luzac. ISBN 978-0718901493. Archived from the original on 10 October 2023.
- Ayoub, Mahmoud (1978). Redemptive Suffering in Islam - A Study of the Devotional Aspects of Ashura in Twelver Shi'ism. Hague: Mouton Publishers. ISBN 90-279-7943-X. Archived from the original on 10 October 2023.
- Howard, I. K. A. (1986). "Husayn the Martyr - A Commentary on the Accounts of the Martyrdom in Arabic Sources". Al-Serāt - Papers from the Imam Ḥusayn Conference, London, July 1984. Vol. 12. London: The Muhammadi Trust of Great Britain and Northern Ireland. pp. 124–142. ISBN 9780710302076.
- Halm, Heinz (1997). Shi'a Islam - From Religion to Revolution. Translated by Allison Brown. Princeton: Markus Wiener Publishers. ISBN 1-55876-134-9.
- Lammens, Henri (1921). Le Califat de Yazid Ier (in French). Beirut: Imprimerie Catholique Beyrouth. OCLC 474534621.
- Jafri, S. M. (1979). Origins and Early Development of Shi'a Islam. London and New York: Longman. ISBN 9780582780804. Archived from the original on 10 October 2023.
- Momen, Moojan (1985). An Introduction to Shi'i Islam. Yale University Press. ISBN 978-0-300-03531-5.
- Al-Bukhari, Muhammad Ibn Ismail (1996). The English Translation of Sahih Al Bukhari With the Arabic Text (in English and Arabic). Translated by Muhammad Muhsin Khan. Al-Saadawi Publications. ISBN 1-881963-59-4.
- Canaan, Tawfiq (1927). Mohammedan Saints and Sanctuaries in Palestine. London, England: Luzac & Co. Archived from the original on 16 May 2019.
- Dakake, Maria Massi (2007). The Charismatic Community: Shi'ite Identity in Early Islam. SUNY Press. ISBN 978-0-7914-7033-6.
- Gordon, Matthew (2005). The Rise of Islam. Greenwood Publishing Group. ISBN 0-313-32522-7.
- Halm, Heinz; Watson, Janet; Hill, Marian (2004). Shi'ism. Edinburgh University Press. ISBN 0-7486-1888-0.
- Madelung, Wilferd (1997). The Succession to Muhammad - A Study of the Early Caliphate. Cambridge University Press. ISBN 978-0-521-64696-3.
- Tabatabae (1979). Shi'ite Islam. Translated by Sayyid Mohammad Hosayn. SUNY Press. ISBN 0-87395-272-3.
- Wellhausen, Julius (1927). The Arab Kingdom and Its Fall. Translated by Margaret Graham Weir. Calcutta: University of Calcutta.
- Wellhausen, Julius (1901). Die religiös-politischen Oppositionsparteien im alten Islam (in German). Berlin: Weidmannsche Buchhandlung. OCLC 453206240.
- Daftary, Farhad (1990). The Ismāʿı̄lı̄s: Their History and Doctrines (First ed.). Cambridge: Cambridge University Press. ISBN 978-0-521-37019-6.
- Tabatabai, Seyed Mohammad Hussein (1996). Tafsir al-Mizan (in Persian).
- Fakhr Razi, Muhammad ibn Umar (1901). Tafsir al-Razi (in Arabic). Beirut: Dar al-Fikr Buchhandlung.
- Ibn Kathir, Ismail Ibn Umar. Tafsir ibn Kathir (in Arabic). Beirut: Dar al-Kitab al-Alamiyah.
- Siouti, Jalaluddin (1901). Tafsir al-Jalalayn (in Arabic). Beirut: Al-Noor Press Foundation.

=== Encyclopedia ===
- Haider, Najam I. (2016). "al-Ḥusayn b. Alī b. Abī Ṭālib". In Fleet, K.; Krämer, G.; Matringe, D.; Nawas, J.; Rowson, E. (eds.). Encyclopaedia of Islam. Vol. 3rd. Brill Publishers. Archived from the original on 13 February 2023.
- Munson, Henry (1988). Islam and Revolution in the Middle East. Yale University Press. ISBN 9780300046045. Archived from the original on 10 October 2023.
- Algar, .H (1984). "Āl–e ʿAbā". Encyclopædia Iranica. Encyclopedia Iranica Foundation. Archived from the original on 18 October 2014.
- Poonawala, Ismail; Kohlberg, Etan (1985). "Alī b. Abī Ṭāleb". In Yarshater, Ehsan (ed.). Encyclopædia Iranica. Vol. 1. Bibliotheca Persica Press. pp. 838–848. Archived from the original on 29 April 2011.
- Veccia Vaglieri, L. (1971). "(al-) Ḥusayn b. Alī b. Abī Ṭālib". In Lewis, B.; Ménage, V. L.; Pellat, Ch. & Schacht, J. (eds.). The Encyclopaedia of Islam, Second Edition. Volume III: H–Iram. Leiden: E. J. Brill. OCLC 495469525.
- Vaglieri, L. Veccia (1960). "ʿAlī b. Abī Ṭālib". In Gibb, H. A. R.; Kramers, J. H.; Lévi-Provençal, E.; Schacht, J.; Lewis, B. & Pellat, Ch. (eds.). The Encyclopaedia of Islam, Second Edition. Volume I: A–B. Leiden: E. J. Brill. pp. 381–386. OCLC 495469456.
- Vaglieri, L. Veccia (1971). "(Al)-Ḥasan b. ʿAlï b. Abï Ṭālib". In Lewis, B.; Ménage, V. L.; Pellat, Ch. & Schacht, J. (eds.). The Encyclopaedia of Islam, Second Edition. Volume III: H–Iram. Leiden: E. J. Brill. pp. 240–243. OCLC 495469525.
- Howard, I. K. A., ed. (1990). The History of al-Ṭabarī, Volume XIX: The Caliphate of Yazīd ibn Muʿāwiyah, A.D. 680–683/A.H. 60–64. SUNY Series in Near Eastern Studies. Albany, New York: State University of New York Press. ISBN 978-0-7914-0040-1.
- Madelung, Wilferd (2004). "Ḥosayn b. Ali I - Life and Significance in Shi'ism". In Yarshater, Ehsan (ed.). Encyclopædia Iranica. Vol. XII. Bibliotheca Persica Press. pp. 493–498. Archived from the original on 29 August 2023.
- Madelung, Wilferd (2011). "ʿALĪ B. ḤOSAYN B. ʿALĪ B. ABĪ ṬĀLEB". In Yarshater, Ehsan (ed.). Encyclopædia Iranica. Vol. I/8. Bibliotheca Persica Press. pp. 849–850. Archived from the original on 22 September 2023.
- Calmard, Jean (2004). "Ḥosayn b. Ali II in Popular Shi'ism". In Yarshater, Ehsan (ed.). Encyclopædia Iranica. Vol. XII. Bibliotheca Persica Press. pp. 498–502. Archived from the original on 8 October 2020.
- "Al-Ḥusayn ibn Alī". Encyclopædia Britannica Online. Encyclopædia Britannica.
- "Plus Index". Encyclopaedia of the Qur'an. Brill Publishers. December 2005. ISBN 90-04-14743-8.
- Madelung, Wilferd (2003). "ḤASAN B. ʿALI B. ABI ṬĀLEB". Encyclopædia Iranica. Encyclopedia Iranica Foundation. Archived from the original on 17 November 2013.
- Faramarz, Haj Manouchehri (2013). "Husaian (as) Imam". Encyclopaedia Islamica. Center for the Great Islamic Encyclopedia. pp. 664–715. ISBN 9786006326191.
- Seyed Mohammad, Emadi Haeri (2009). "Hussein bin Ali, Imam.". Encyclopedia of the Islamic World. Islamic Encyclopedia Foundation. Archived from the original on 13 February 2023.
- Fığlâlı, E.Ruhı; Üzün, İlyâs (1998). "HÜSEYİN – An article published in Turkish Encyclopedia of Islam". TDV İslâm Ansiklopedisi (in Turkish). Vol. 18 (Hilal - Huseyin Lamekani). pp. 518–524. ISBN 978-97-53-8944-56. Archived from the original on 13 February 2023.

Husayn ibn Ali of the Ahl al-Bayt Banu Hashim Clan of the Quraish Born: 3 Sha'bān AH 4 in the ancient (intercalated) Arabic calendar 10 October 625 Died: 10 Muharram AH 61 10 October 680
Shia Islam titles
Preceded by Hasan ibn Ali; Disputed by Nizari	2nd Imam of Ismaili Shia; 3rd Imam of Kaysanites, Zaydis, Seveners and Twelvers Shi'a; 669–680	Succeeded by Ali ibn Husayn Zayn al-Abidin
Preceded by Hasan ibn Ali; Disputed by Nizari	2nd Imam of Ismaili Shia; 3rd Imam of Kaysanites, Zaydis, Seveners and Twelvers Shi'a; 669–680	Succeeded by Muhammad ibn al-Hanafiyyah; Kaysanites successor
