= The Hussaini Encyclopedia =

Book about Husayn ibn Ali

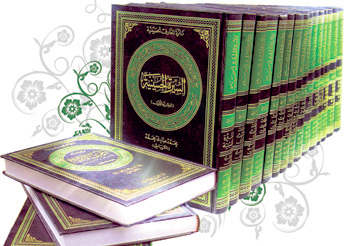
- The Hussaini Encyclopedia
- Author: Dr. Sheikh Mohammed Sadiq Al-Karbassi
- Language: Arabic (العربية)
- Subject: Husayn ibn Ali
- Genre: Imam Hussain encyclopedia
- Publisher: Hussaini Centre for Research
- Publication place: United Kingdom (1987-present)
- Media type: As of January 2016: 105 volumes published and over 700 volumes handwritten
- ISBN: 9781902490243
- OCLC: 756440452

The Hussaini Encyclopedia (Arabic - دائرة المعارف الحسينية - Dāʾirat al-maʿārif al-Ḥusaynīyah) is an encyclopedia in Arabic about Husayn ibn Ali, the third Shia imam, and people and places connected to him. Over 105 volumes and over 95 million words have been published. The author, Mohammed Sadiq Al-Karbassi, established the Hussaini Center for Research in London in 1993. The Hussaini Encyclopedia particularly focuses on the aftermath of battle of Karbala.

== About the Hussaini Encyclopedia ==
In 1987, Al-Karbassi planned to work on the Hussaini Encyclopedia and established the Hussaini Center for Research in London in 1993. The encyclopedia is completely themed on Imam Al-Hussain His inspiration to start this work was by him who "does not speak out of his own fancy" (The Star 53-3 – i.e. the Islamic prophet Mohammed) when he declared: "Hussain is from me and I am from Hussain". And this work has penetrated the barriers of time, place, language and identity in searching and conveying pieces of information related to the Cause of Imam Al-Hussain.

It covers many different aspects and things which are related to Hussain Ibn Ali, these include: Al-Hussain in the Quran, The Hussaini Biography, Al-Hussain and Legislation, The Dreams, Visions and Interpretations, Glossary of Al-Hussain's Partisans, Glossary of Hashemite Partisans of Al-Hussain, Historical Investigations in the Hussaini uprising, Imam Al-Hussain's Uprising – Emergence and Confirmation of History, Al-Hussain's Life Story, History of the Shrines, 'Ziyara' at Al-Hussaini Shrines, Anthology of the First to Fifteenth Hijra Century poetry, Arabic, Persian, Urdu, Turkish, English, Albanian, Oriental and Occidental Poetry.

The Hussain Encyclopedia is in Arabic but some parts have been translated into different languages such as: English, Persian, Urdu and Pashto. It now consists of over 700 volumes and will over 95 million words, these numbers are expected to continue growing.

This is in principle individual work; however, the author has had assistance from people such as researchers, poets, men-of-letters and journalists.

To avoid misunderstanding, the title of the Encyclopedia has been registered in the international languages.

Some of the Hussaini Encyclopedia are available as online books.

The Hussaini Encyclopedia is Available in many Libraries.

Bodleian Libraries of the University of Oxford.

Mar'ashi Najafi library, Qom.

Cambridge University Library.

The National Library of Scotland.

The library of Trinity College, Dublin.

The National Library of Wales.

Stanford University Library, California.

Harvard University Library, Massachusetts.

== About Imam Hussain ==
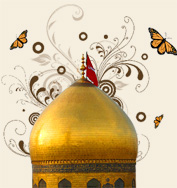
Imam Hussain's Shrine

Husayn ibn Ali, the grandson of Muhammad and son of Ali & Fatimah; the third Imam of Shia Muslims, who is also known as the Martyr of Martyrs, was killed on Friday, 10th Muharram, 61 Hijri in the Battle of Kerbela, the place is situated at present day Iraq. This day is more commonly known as the Day of Ashura. He was massacred along with some followers, friends, relatives, and his family members by the army of Yazid ibn Mu'awiya, through this promised immolation the faith of Islam was rescued. Yazid's attempt to mold the doctrine of faith and planned to have it endorsed by pledge of allegiance from Hussain Ibn Ali became void by this sacrifice.

== Author ==
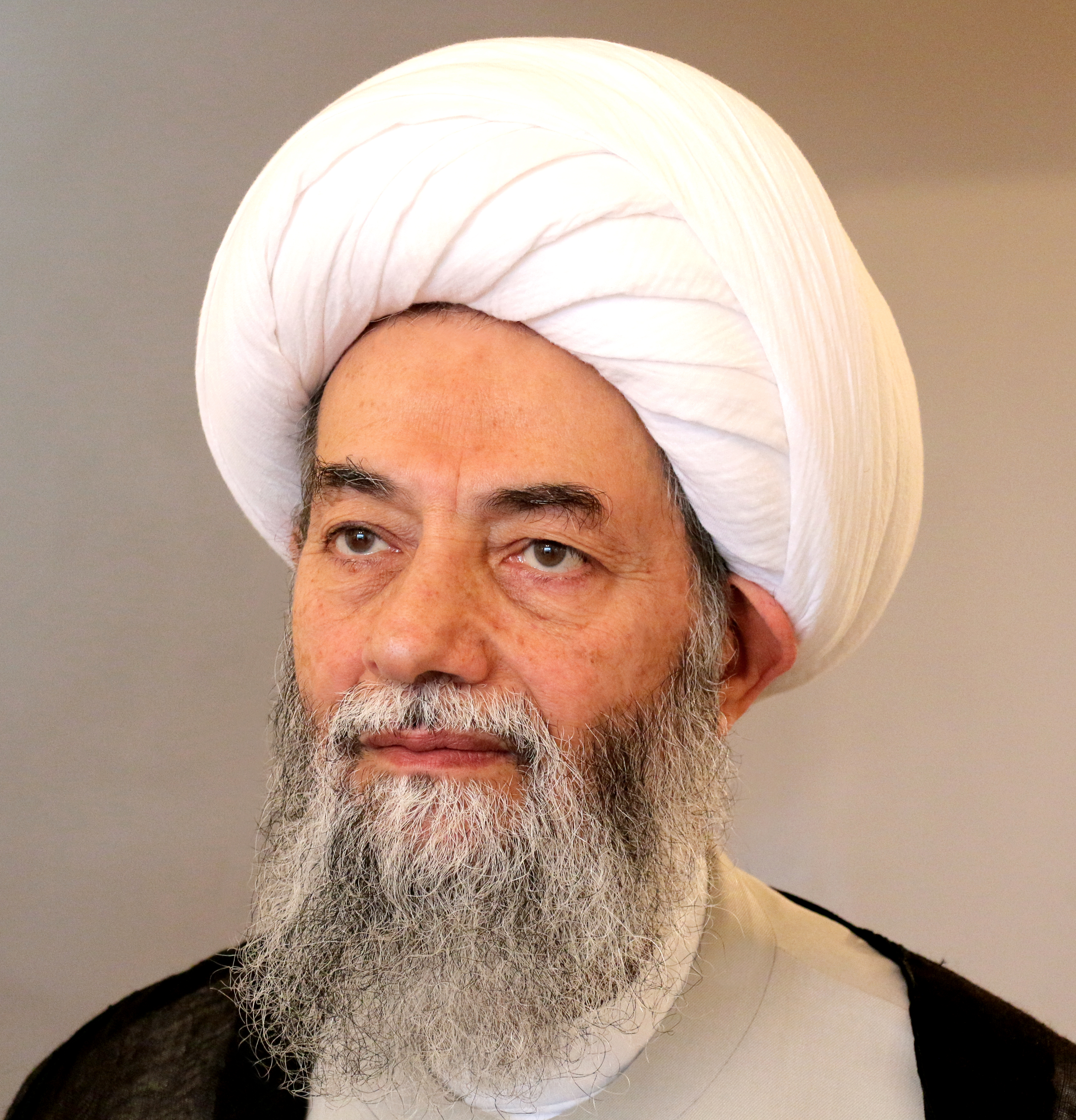
Al-Karbassi

The author of The Hussaini Encyclopedia Sheikh Mohammed Sadiq Al-Karbassi was born 20th Oct, 1947 (5th ZilHijjah 1366 in the City of Kerbela, Iraq. He comes from a well-educated family and graduated from established academic institutions of Kerbela, Najaf, Teheran and Qum. Al-Karbassi has lived in Iraq, Iran, Lebanon, and Syria; he now resides in the United Kingdom. Sheikh Al-Karbassi has founded, or took part in founding, some forty institutions and has practiced teaching, authorship, research and imamate, along with practicing the teaching Islamic bodies of knowledge in different cultural metropolitan cities. His work exceeds hundreds, with his work being published in various magazines and articles and his biography has been cited in numerous reference books. His self-fulfilment is in the Hussaini Encyclopedia, work on this commenced on the eve of the eleventh of Muharram, 1408 H, the 5th of September 1987. He has never ceased his work since then.

== About The Centre ==
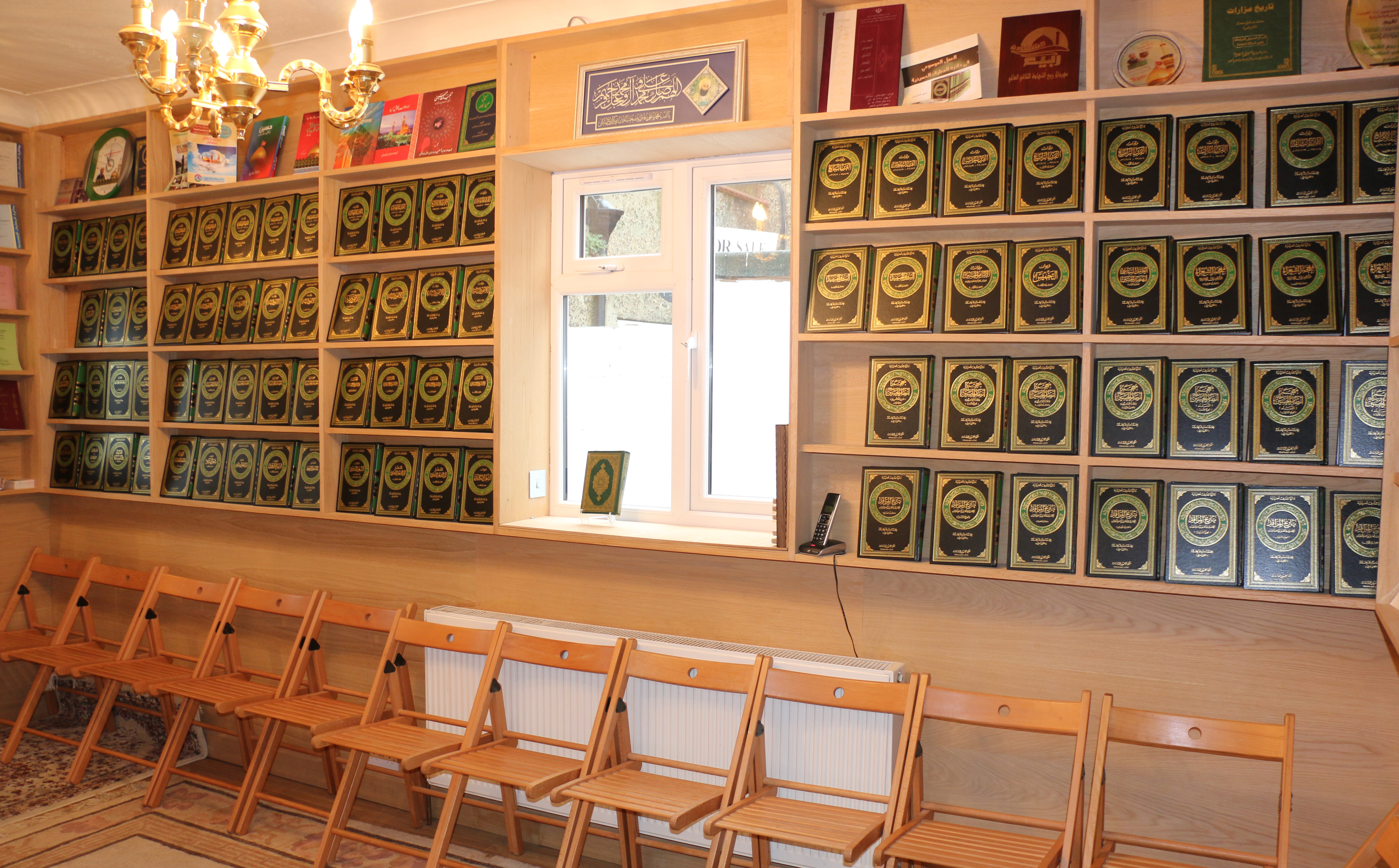
The Hussaini Centre for Research

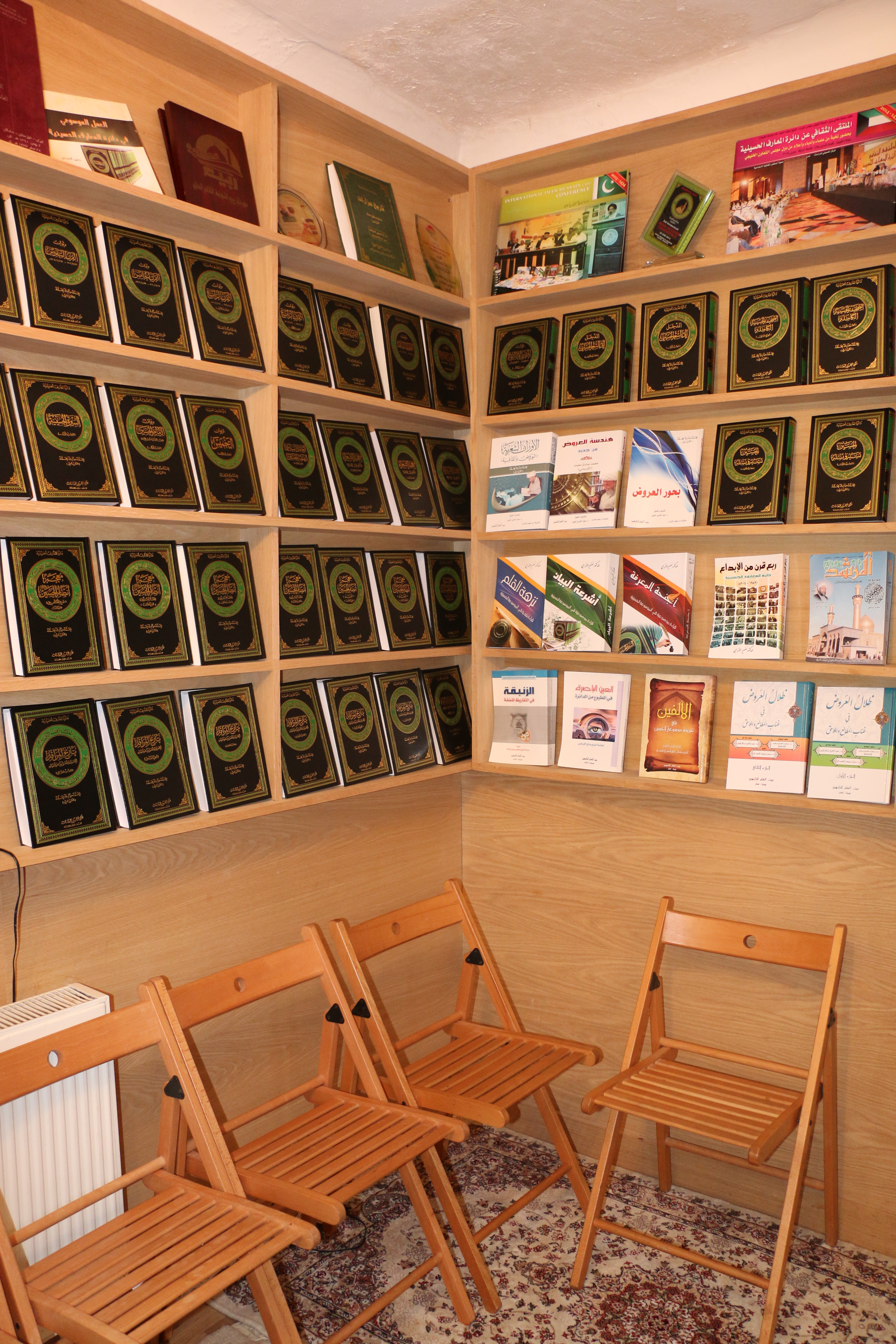
The Hussaini Centre for Research

The Hussaini Centre for Research was established in London in 1993 (1414 H), Sheikh Mohammed Sadiq Mohammed Al-Karbassi used his home as the first base, and foundation for research as his office. There he welcomed politicians and journalists to his home. The centre has relocated to its current location in 2003. The Hussaini Centre Registered Charity in the UK. No: 1106596, under the title "The Hussaini Charitable Trust".

The centre has a hall for general meetings, with rooms for studying, researching and translating texts. The centre receives many students looking to use its growing private library, which contains over 25,000 titles, specializing on topics of different scholars, with texts and archives in many languages.

The centre stands alone when it comes to holding an entire specialized department containing handwritten and rare documents on different scientific and philosophical topics; the documents in this specialized department hold important historical and scientific value, some being hundreds of years old.

The centre continuously receives awards and nominations, for science and academic studies. The centre has also been the recipient of highly regarded certificates and given the approval of many researchers on science and knowledge. They have visited the centre on countless occasions to dwell upon and answer many questions regarding science and the development of life.

The centre continuously tries to answer the queries of various university students and researchers, using the knowledge of Sheikh Al-Karbassi, and centre's personal library. Many university professors from around the world's universities, notably the UK, Canada, and Germany, have requested their students to study the centre's publications and documents.

The centre has strong relationships and works on many projects regarding science and culture with other global establishments, universities and colleges; including relations with academic professors and lecturers in: Algeria, Australia, Bahrain, Canada, China, Cyprus, France, Iran, Iraq, Italy, Kuwait, Lebanon, Norway, Palestine, Russia, Saudi Arabia, South Africa, Sweden, Switzerland, Syria, Tajikistan, the United Kingdom, the United States of America, and many other countries.

The most notable work of the Hussaini Centre for Research would be the production of The Hussaini Encyclopedia itself, which consists of more than 700 handwritten books (drafts) and 130 books published so far. The encyclopedia itself is mainly about Imam Hussain, and anything connected to Imam Hussain is also mentioned and written about in this great encyclopedia.
