= Abd Allah ibn Yaqtar =

Abd Allah ibn Yaqtar عبد الله بن یقطر

Personal life
- Died: 10th of Muharram, 61 A.H. / 10 October, 680 AD
- Cause of death: Killed in the Battle of Karbala
- Resting place: Karbala, Iraq
- Known for: Being a companion of Husayn ibn Ali

Religious life
- Religion: Islam

Abd Allah ibn Yaqtar (Arabic:عبد الله بن یقطر). According to some sources, he refused to curse Ali and Husayn therefore was thrown off the Dar al-Khilafa. Other sources have included 'Abd Allah among the martyrs of Karbala.

== Lineage ==
He was born in Medina. Abd Allah ibn Yaqtar ibn Abi 'Aqb Laythi was a descendant of Banu Layth ibn Bakr ibn 'Abd Manaf ibn Kinana. He was known as the Rida'i brother of Husayn ibn Ali, meaning that they were both suckled as infants from the same woman. Due to this relationship with the Husayn, Ibn Hajar considered 'Abd Allah among the Companions.

== Biography ==
According to most historians, 'Abd Allah's father was named Yaqtar but al-Tabari is an exception and named him as Baqtar. his mother was named Maymuna.

== Ambassador to Kufa ==
Most scholars state that Hussain sent Abd Allah ibn Yaqtar to Kufa with a letter to Muslim ibn Aqil informing him of Husayn's caravan heading off.

== Martyrdom ==
Ibn Ziyad gave the order to throw 'Abd Allah ibn Yaqtar off the roof of the palace. This did not kill him, but broke his bones and left him in considerable pain. Then a man went down and beheaded him. When people in the area objected to his murder, the man stated he simply wanted to relieve him of his pain. Al-Tabari states this man was 'Abd al-Malik ibn 'Umayr al-Lakhmi.

In contrast, Ibn Kathir relates the same story to Qays ibn Musahhar. Like Ibn Kathir, he considers Qays ibn Musahhar to be the letter-bearer. He does also mention 'Abd Allah ibn Yaqtar in al-Irshad, but considers it a weak report.

This is while Ibn Sa'd reported 'Abd Allah was martyred on the first day of Ibn Ziyad arrival to Kufa, before the martyrdom of Muslim ibn 'Aqil.
