= Çuka Partizani =

Summit in Albania

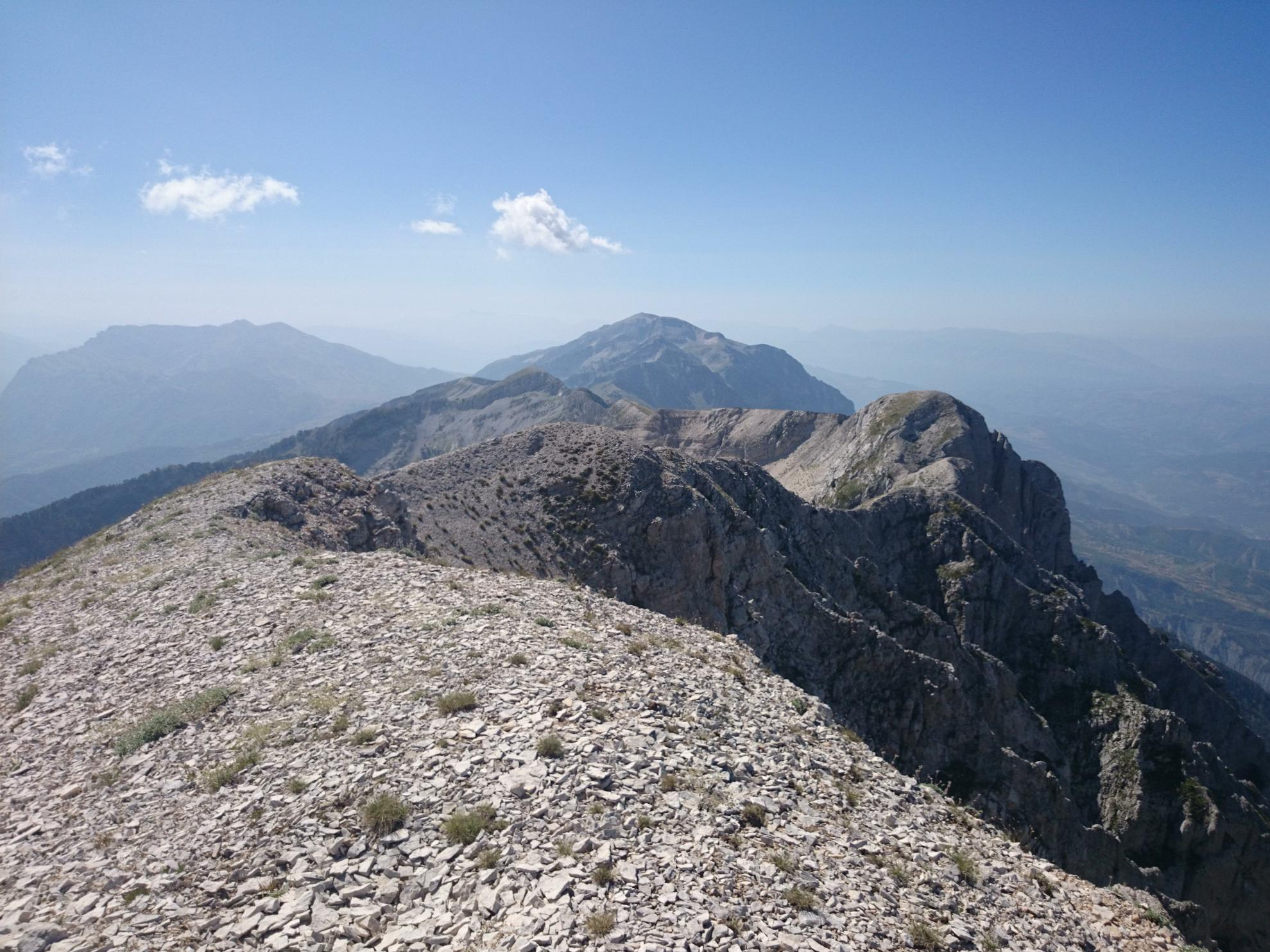
- Çuka e Partizanit seen from a distance on the summit of Mount Tomorr

Highest point
- Elevation: 2,416 m (7,927 ft)
- Prominence: 1,662 m (5,453 ft)
- Isolation: 65.6 km (40.8 mi)
- Listing: Ribu
- Coordinates: 40°42′25″N 20°08′36″E

Naming
- English translation: Partisan Peak

Geography
- Location within Albania
- Country: Albania
- Region: Southern Mountain Region
- Municipality: Skrapar
- Parent range: Tomorr-Kulmak-Miçan

Geology
- Rock age: Quaternary
- Mountain type: peak
- Rock type(s): limestone, flysch

Çuka Partizani (lit. 'Partisan Peak') is the highest peak of the Tomorr massif, located in south-central Albania. Part of the larger Tomorr–Kulmak–Miçan mountain chain, it reaches a height of 2,416 m (7,927 ft), making it the second highest peak in the Southern Mountain Region, after Papingu.

== Etymology ==
The summit derived its current name on 21 May 1950, during an expedition of 49 mountaineers led by Minella Kapo. The term çukë is an alternative Albanian word for peak. While "Çuka e Partizanit" may be the grammatically correct genitive form, the peak is consistently referred to as Çuka Partizani in geographical sources.

== Geology ==
The peak is situated at the northern edge of Tomorr, ascending in the shape of a pyramid, characterized by steep slopes composed of Quaternary ice. Glacial cirques can be found on the eastern flank of the peak which remains snow-covered from early autumn through the end of summer.

== Climbing route ==
The most common route approaches the summit from the northern side, crossing steep gravel slopes and sections of loose talus. The ascent involves an elevation gain of over 1,450 meters and typically takes about seven hours to complete.

== See also ==
- List of mountains in Albania
