= Tomorrica (river) =

River in Albania

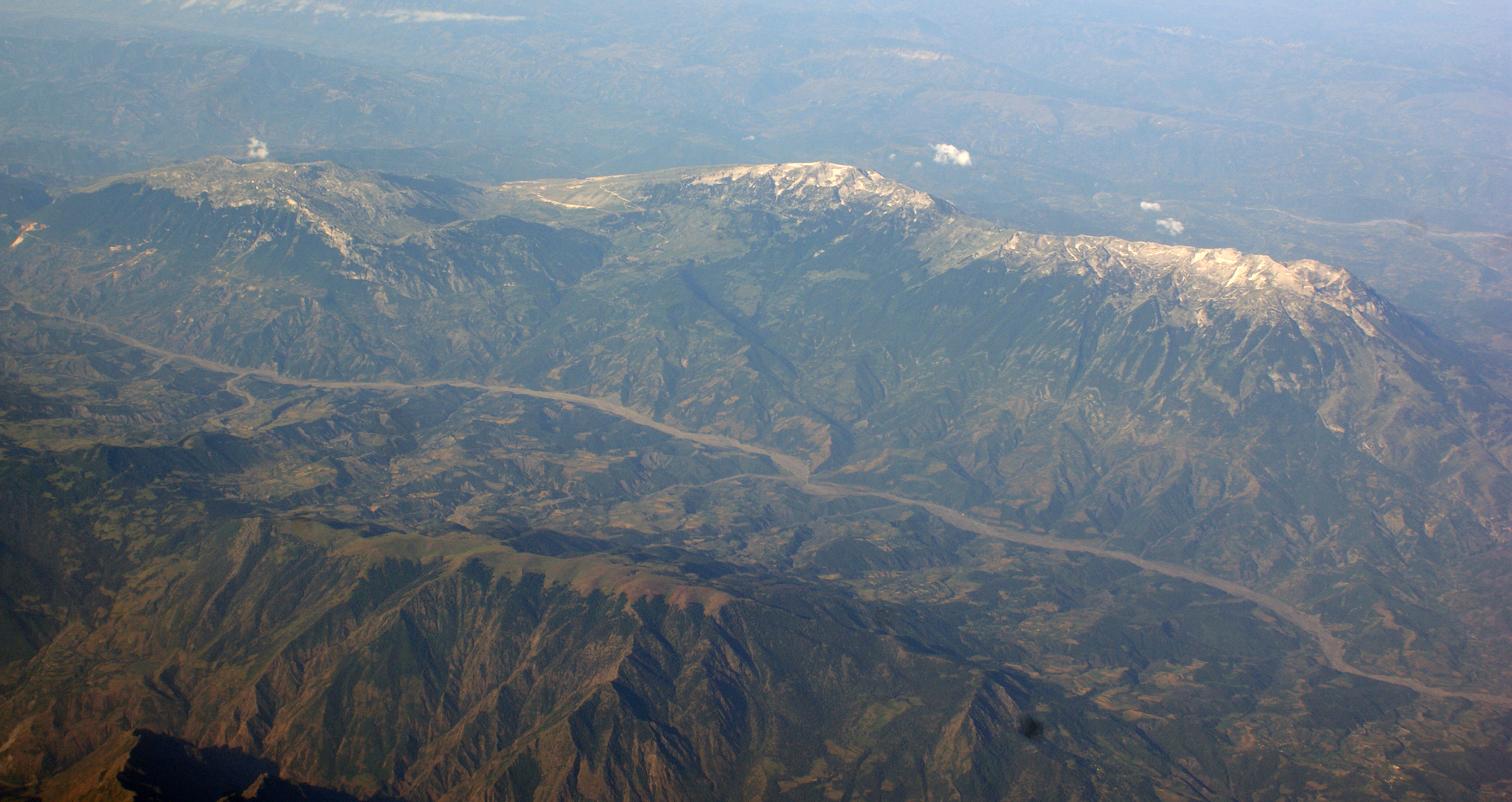
- Aerial view of Tomorrica flowing by Mount Tomorr

Location
- Country: Albania

Physical characteristics
- Source
  - location: Gjogovicë
  - coordinates: 40°34′51″N 20°19′48″E
- Mouth: Devoll
  - location: near Gramsh
- Length: 42 km (26 mi)
- Basin size: 376 km^{2} (145 sq mi)

Basin features
- Progression: Devoll→ Seman→ Adriatic Sea

Tomorrica is a river in south-central Albania and the largest tributary of the Devoll River. It drains a basin of approximately 376 km² (145 sq mi), with a mean elevation of 378 m (1,240 ft) above sea level. The river is 41.7 km (25.9 mi) long and forms part of the Seman River watershed.

== Course ==
The Tomorrica rises between Mali i Mollës and Mali i Lipës in the Tomorr mountain region. From its source, it follows a predominantly northwestern course before emptying into the Devoll River near the town of Gramsh.

The basin is bounded on the western side by the Tomorr–Kulmak mountain chain and on the eastern side by the Roshnicë and Çipa uplands. The valley extends in a regular northwest–southeast direction and is characterized by a strongly dissected erosional landscape. Numerous streams and seasonal torrents descend from the surrounding slopes and contribute to the river’s flow.

One of the most distinctive features of the Tomorrica is its broad valley floor, which reaches widths of 200–300 m (660–980 ft) in some places.

== Hydrology ==
The river basin is predominantly composed of flysch formations, which support a dense drainage network, while the limestone massif of Mount Tomorr serves as an important karst aquifer. Numerous springs emerge at the contact between limestone and flysch, particularly near Ujanik, Kërpicë and Sotirë, feeding several tributary streams.

The river has a steep average gradient of 31 m/km. Near its confluence with the Devoll River, it forms a small alluvial delta shaped by ongoing sediment deposition. The average annual discharge at the mouth is estimated at 8.21 m³/s (290 cu ft/s), corresponding to a specific runoff of 21.8 l/s/km².

== See also ==
- List of rivers of Albania
