= Abdullah ibn Ali ibn Abi Talib =

Son of Ali ibn Abi Talib and Umm al-Banin (died 680)

Abdullah ibn Ali ibn Abi Talib عَبْد ٱللَّٰه ٱبْن عَلِيّ ٱبْن أَبِي طَالِب
- Born: 656 AD / 35 AH; Medina, Rashidun Caliphate
- Died: 10 October 680; Karbala, Umayyad Caliphate
- Parents: Ali (father); Umm al-Banin (mother)
- Relatives: Al-Hasan (half-brother); Al-Husayn (half-brother); Abbas ibn Ali (full-brother); Ja'far ibn Ali (full-brother); Uthman ibn Ali (full-brother); Al-Hanafiyyah (half-brother); Hasan ibn Hasan (nephew); Qasim ibn Hasan (nephew); Talha ibn Hasan (nephew); Abdullah ibn Hasan (nephew); Abu Bakr ibn Hasan (nephew); Fatimah bint Hasan (niece); Ali ibn Husayn (nephew); Ali Zayn al-Abidin
- Family: Family of Ali

ʿAbd Allāh ibn ʿAlī ibn Abī Ṭālib (Arabic: عَبْد ٱللَّٰه ٱبْن عَلِيّ ٱبْن أَبِي طَالِب) was one of Ali's sons who was killed in Karbala in 680, and is considered among the martyrs of the Battle of Karbala. Abdullah is also among the four sons of Umm al-Banin, the daughter of Hazam. His kunya was Abu Muhammad.

== Battle of Karbala ==
Historians have written about Abdullah ibn Ali ibn Abi Talib that on the day of Ashura, when the companions of Husayn ibn Ali and many of his family were killed, Abbas ibn Ali called out his brothers in age order and told them to attack on the battlefield. Abdullah ibn Ali was the first one who was called in order to fight Umar ibn Sa'd's army. Abbas said to him:

"O my brother, you first go to the battle field, because you don't have children (to be sad of the kid(s)). I want to see you to be killed in the way of Allah, and to be patient in your martyrdom."

So Abdullah went to the battlefield and recited epic verse(s). Then he embarked onto the battlefield striking out with his sword. Eventually Hani ibn Thabit attacked him and struck Abdullah on his head, killing him. He was 35 years old when he was killed, and his killer was Hani ibn Thabit al-Hadhrami. Hani ibn Thabit's name was mentioned in the Ziyarat al-Nahiya al-Muqaddasa and by Ja'far ibn Ali ibn Abi Talib as the killer of Abdullah Talib.
