= Miçan =

Mountain in Albania

- Mali i Miçanit
- Location within Albania

Highest point
- Elevation: 1,581 m (5,187 ft)
- Prominence: 33 m (108 ft)
- Isolation: 23 m (75 ft)
- Coordinates: 40°26′00″N 20°23′00″E

Geography
- Country: Albania
- Region: Southern Mountain Region
- Municipality: Përmet, Skrapar
- Parent range: Tomorr–Kulmak–Miçan

Geology
- Mountain type: mountain
- Rock type(s): limestone, flysch

Miçan (def. 'Miçani') is a mountain in Albania, situated in the southeastern section of the Tomorr–Kulmak–Miçan mountain range, straddled between the borders of Skrapar and Përmet municipalities. Its highest peak, Qeshibeshi, reaches a height of 1,581 m (5,187 ft).

== Geology ==
Composed predominantly of limestone and flysch, the mountain has an asymmetrical cone shape with a steeper eastern slope and a relatively gentler western slope, with numerous cracks and karst pits on its ridge.

== Biodiversity ==
Vegetation is sparse, although in the southern and southwestern slopes, oak and hazel are grown in abundance. Other parts of the mountain have limited vegetation, including elk, gorse, ash and sedge. The area provides lush summer pastures where mountain tea and other medicinal plants are cultivated.

== See also ==
- List of mountains in Albania
