= Umm al-Banin =

Wife of Ali ibn Abi Talib

- أُمّ ٱلْبَنِين
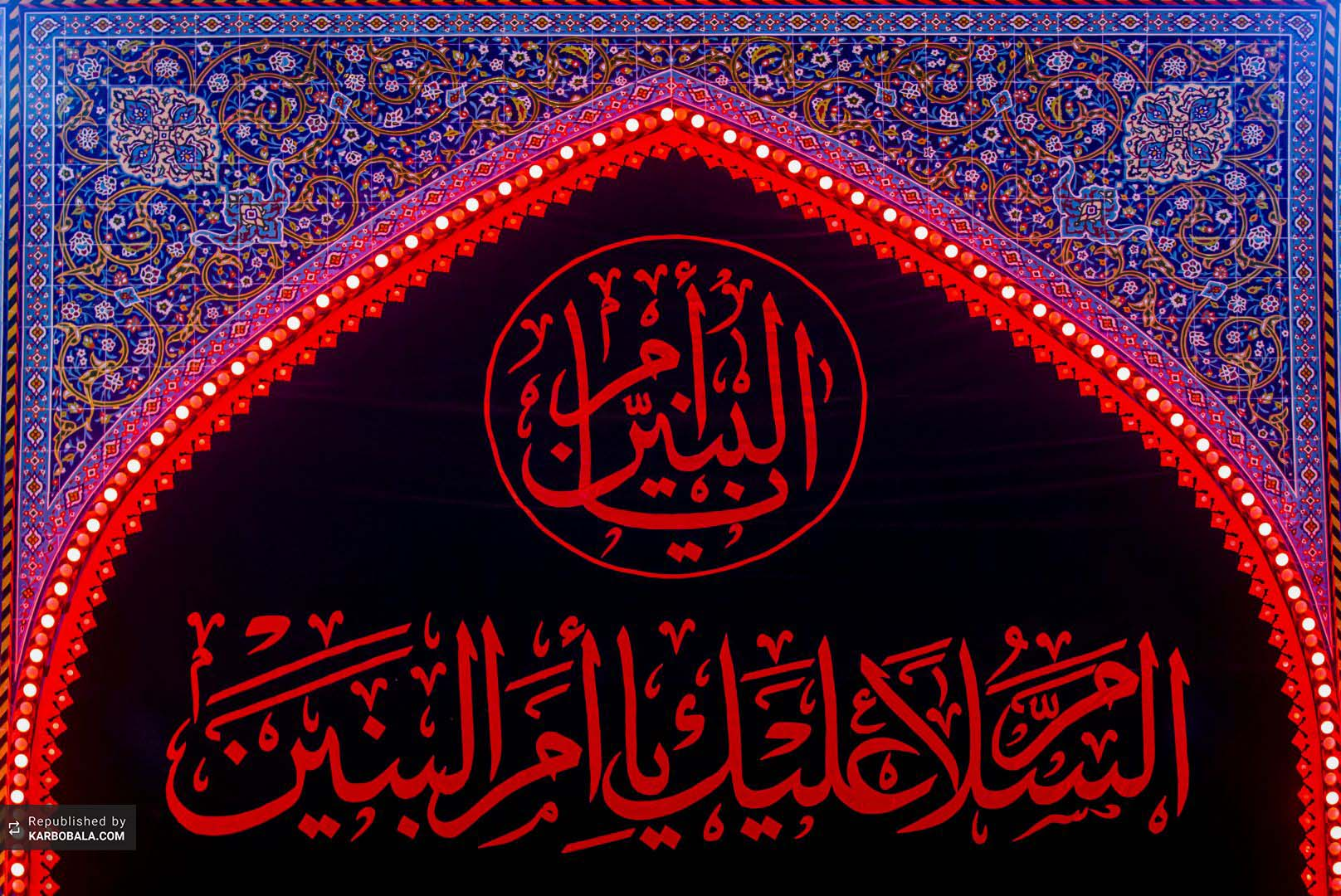
- A flag at the Imam Husayn Shrine in Karbala, with the name of Umm al-Banin.
- Resting place: Al-Baqi Cemetery, Medina, Saudi Arabia
- Known for: Wife of Ali ibn Abi Talib; Mother of Abbas ibn Ali
- Title: أُمّ ٱلْبَنِين (lit. 'mother of the sons')
- Spouse: Ali
- Children: Abbas ibn Ali; Abd Allah ibn Ali; Ja'far ibn Ali; Uthman ibn Ali
- Parents: Huzam ibn Khalid ibn Rabi'ah ibn al-Wahid ibn Ka'b ibn 'Amir ibn Kilab (father); Thumama bint Sahl ibn 'Amir ibn Malik ibn Ja'far ibn Kilab (mother)
- Family: List: Banu Kilab (by birth); Banu Hashim (by marriage)

Fatima bint Huzam (Arabic: فَاطِمَة بِنْت حُزَام), better known as Umm al-Banin (Arabic: أُمّ ٱلْبَنِين, lit. 'mother of the sons'), was a wife of Ali, the cousin and son-in-law of the Islamic prophet Muhammad, the first Shia Imam and the fourth Rashidun caliph. She belonged to the Banu Kilab tribe of the Qays confederation. Ali married Umm al-Banin sometime after the death of his first wife Fatima in 632, the daughter of Muhammad.

She bore Ali four sons, and consequently became known as Umm al-Banin, meaning “Mother of the Sons”. All four of her sons—Abbas, Abdullah, Ja'far, and Uthman—were killed at the Battle of Karbala. Especially in Iran and Iraq, women make the supplication of tawassul to Umm al-Banin, requesting her soul to join her prayers to them, particularly when in dire need or to find patience in difficult times.

== Biography ==
Her date of birth is unknown. It is said that her birth occurred between 5–9 AH, which means she was born around 5 AH. Al-Karbasi mentioned that Umm al-Banin was born before 4 BH (Before Hijra). The Shia-leaning historian Abu al-Faraj al-Isfahani (d. 967) gives some information about her marriage to Ali in his Maqatil al-Talibiyyin, a historical-biographical compilation about the descendants of Ali. He writes that Aqil, a brother of Ali knowledgeable in Arab genealogy, introduced Fatima bint Huzam to Ali because her tribe was famed for courage in the hope that she would bear Ali brave sons. Her marriage to Ali brought the couple four sons: Abbas, Abd Allah, Ja'far, and Uthman.

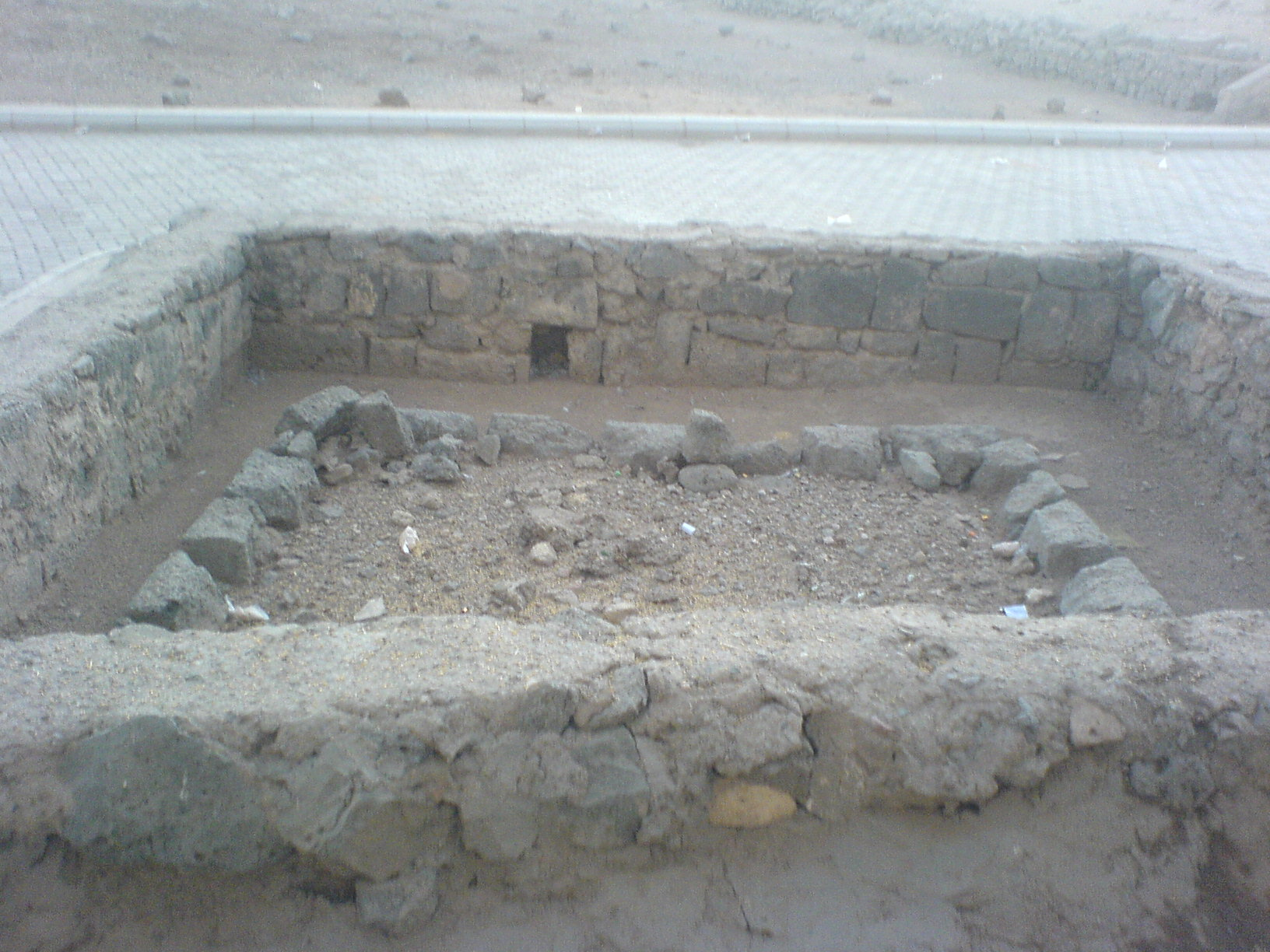
The grave of Umm al-Banin in the al-Baqi Cemetery, Medina.

It was because of her sons' courage that she became known as Umm al-Banin (lit. 'mother of the sons'), reads a poem attributed to Fatima bint Huzam. All four fought alongside their half-brother Husayn ibn Ali in the Battle of Karbala (680) and were killed with him. When Umm al-Banin received the news of their deaths in Karbala, she reputedly said that she would have given her sons and everything on the earth to see Husayn alive again. The Shia scholar Yusofi-Oshkuri views this as a sign of her devotion to the Ahl al-Bayt, that is, the House of Muhammad. Upon her return from Karbala, Zaynab bint Ali is also said to have personally visited Umm al-Banin to offer condolences. She regularly visited the al-Baqi Cemetery in Medina to mourn with her grandson, Ubayd-Allah, who was Abbas' son. Her poems would bring those present to tears, even apparently the Umayyad Marwan ibn Hakam. She is buried in the al-Baqi but the year of her death is unknown.

== See also ==
- Fatima
- Bibi Pak Daman
- Battle of Karbala
- Sermon of Ali ibn Husayn in Damascus
