= Qasim ibn Abbas =

Son of Abbas ibn Ali

Al-Qasim ibn al-Abbas القاسِم ٱبْن ٱلْعَبَّاس

Personal life
- Born: 42AH, 661AD Medina
- Died: 10th of Muharram, 61 A.H. / 10 October, 680 AD Karbala, Umayyad Caliphate
- Cause of death: Killed in the Battle of Karbala
- Parents: Abbas ibn Ali (father); Sayyida Umm al-Sughra Lubaba bint Ubayd Allah ibn Abbas ibn Abd al-Muttalib (mother)
- Known for: Nephew of Husayn ibn Ali

Religious life
- Religion: Islam

Al-Qāsim ibn al-ʿAbbas (Arabic: القاسِم ٱبْن ٱلْعَبَّاس) is regarded by some sources among the martyrs of the Battle of Karbala. In later sources al-Qasim ibn al-Abbas is referred to as the son of al-Abbas ibn Ali with his mother being Sayyida Umm-al sughra Lubaba bint Ubaydullah ibn al-Abbas. He and his brother Muhammad ibn Al-Abbas died in the Battle of Karbala. At the time of his death he was 19 years old.
