= Abbas Ali Türbe =

Shrine in south-central Albania

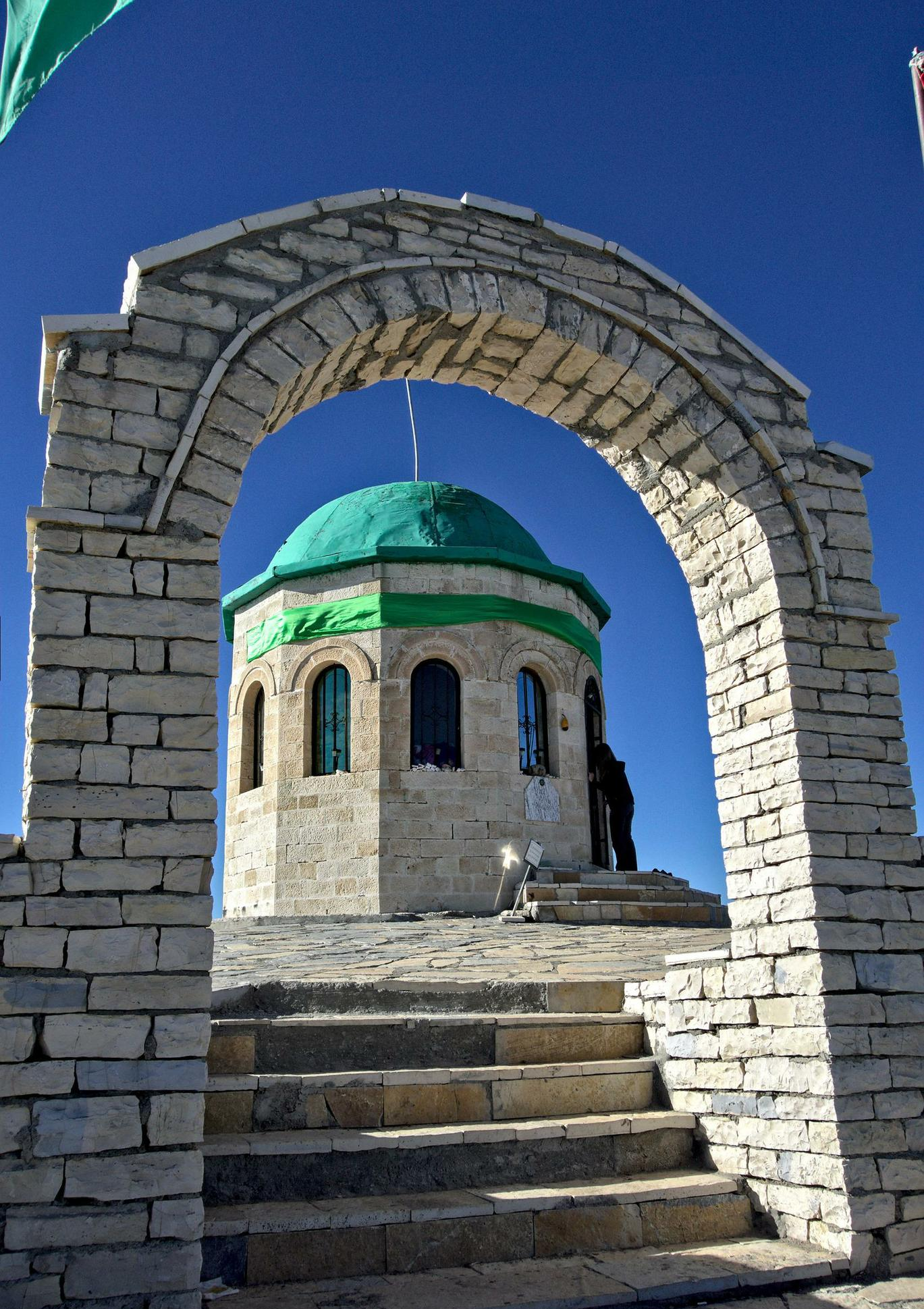

- Location within Albania

Religion
- Affiliation: Islam
- Rite: Bektashi Order
- Year consecrated: 1620

Location
- Location: Mount Tomorr
- Municipality: Berat
- Country: Albania
- Interactive map of Abbas Ali Türbe
- Coordinates: 40°38′11″N 20°09′45″E

Architecture
- Cultural Monument of Albania

The Abbas ibn Ali Türbe (Albanian: Tyrbja e Abaz Aliut) is a Bektashi türbe (Albanian: tyrbe "shrine", or mekam, "holy tomb"), a shrine traditionally considered to be the resting place of Abbas ibn Ali (647–680), a son of Ali. It is situated on the southern peak of Mount Tomorr in Berat, south-central Albania. A large annual pilgrimage is currently held every year from 20–25 August.

The shrine, originally constructed in 1620, is included in the List of Religious Cultural Monuments of Albania.

== Bektashi traditions ==
According to the traditions of the Bektashi Order, a Sufi community based primarily in Albania, Abbas ibn Ali (Albanian: Abaz Aliu) went to Albania on a white horse to save it from the barbarians. Today, he continues to return to Mount Tomorr in Albania for five days (August 20–25) each year, during which animal sacrifices are made and homage is paid to Abbas ibn Ali. During these five days, Bektashi pilgrims visit the türbe, which is believed to house the remains of Abbas ibn Ali. The mausoleum lies adjacent to the Bektashi tekke on Mount Tomorr, which was built in 1916.

In another Bektashi legend, Haji Bektash once saw Christian pilgrims ascend Mount Tomorr on August 15, the feast day of the Assumption of the Virgin Mary. He responded by making a journey to the grave of Abbas ibn Ali in the holy city of Karbala, where he dug up an arm bone belonging to Abbas ibn Ali. Haji Bektash then threw the arm bone up onto the peak of Mount Tomorr, thus turning the mountain into the second sacred grave (türbe) of Abbas ibn Ali.

== In Albanian literature ==
Naim Frashëri wrote in a poem in his 1890 poetry book Luletë e verësë ("Summer Flowers"):

Original Albanian text

Abas Aliu zu’ Tomorë,
Erdhi afër nesh,
Shqipëria s’mbet e gjorë,
Se Zoti e desh.

English translation

Abbas Ali took over Tomorr,
He came to live with us,
Albania was no longer afflicted
For God came to love it.

== Gallery ==
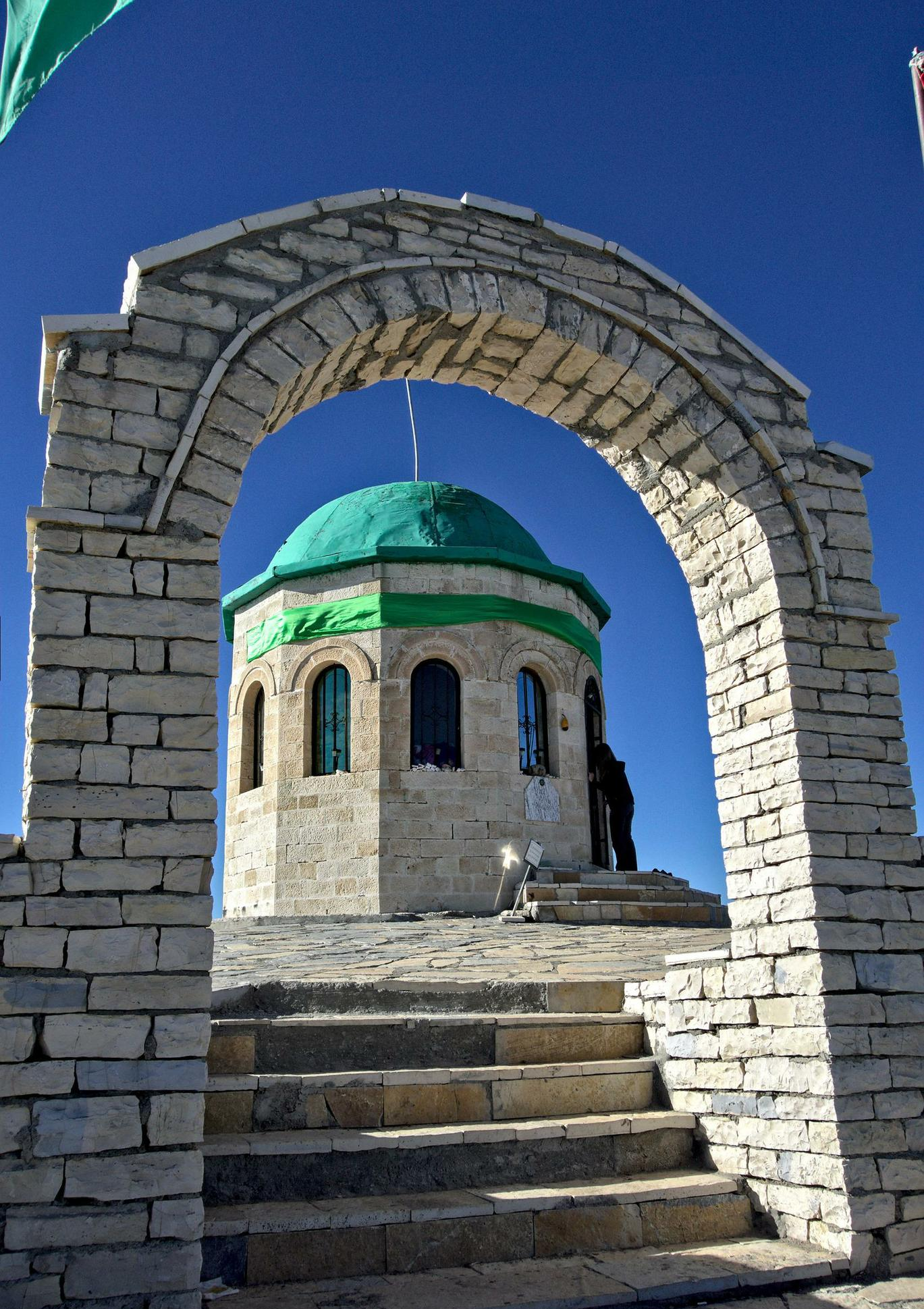
Türbe of Abbas ibn Ali on Mount Tomorr

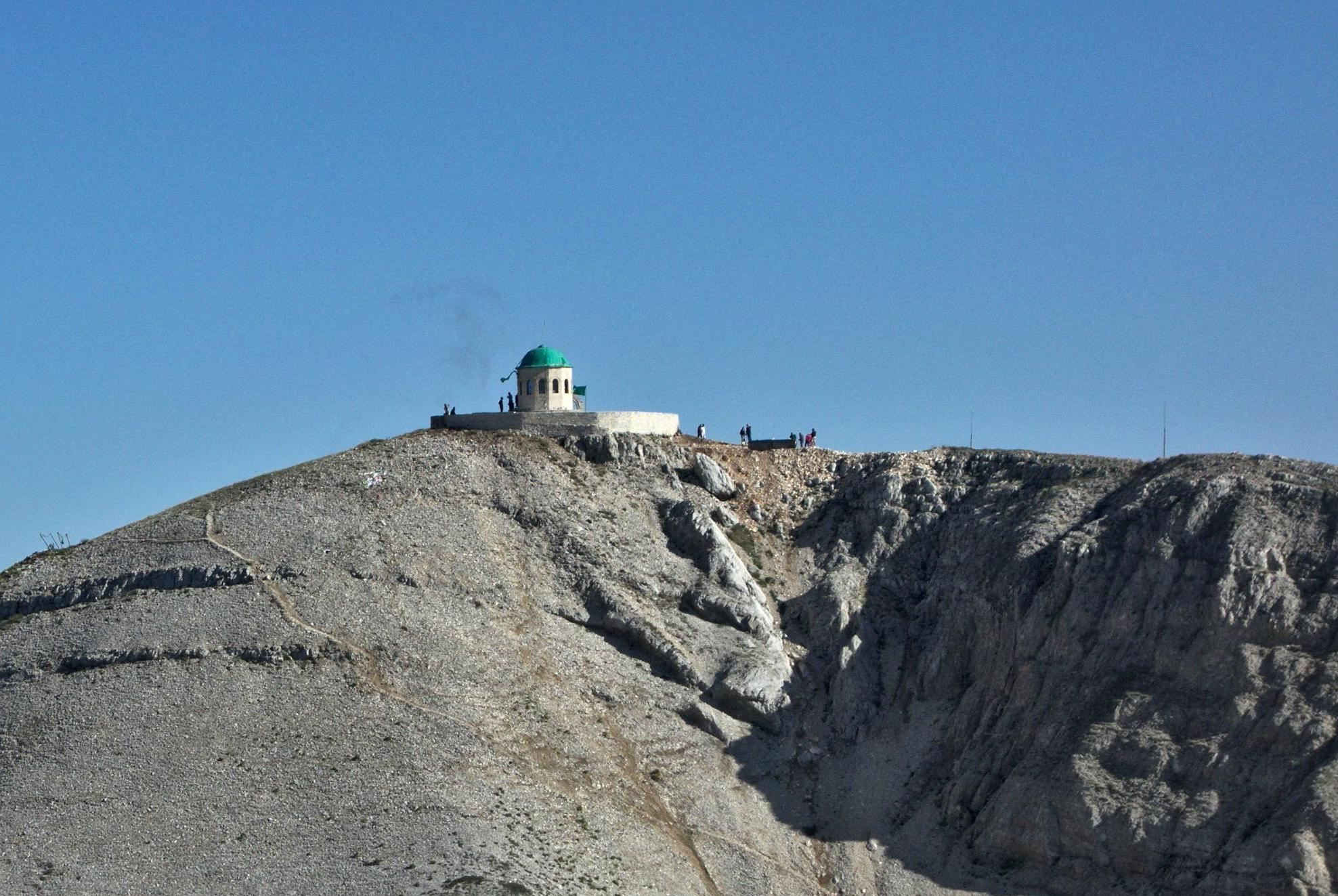
Türbe of Abbas ibn Ali on Mount Tomorr

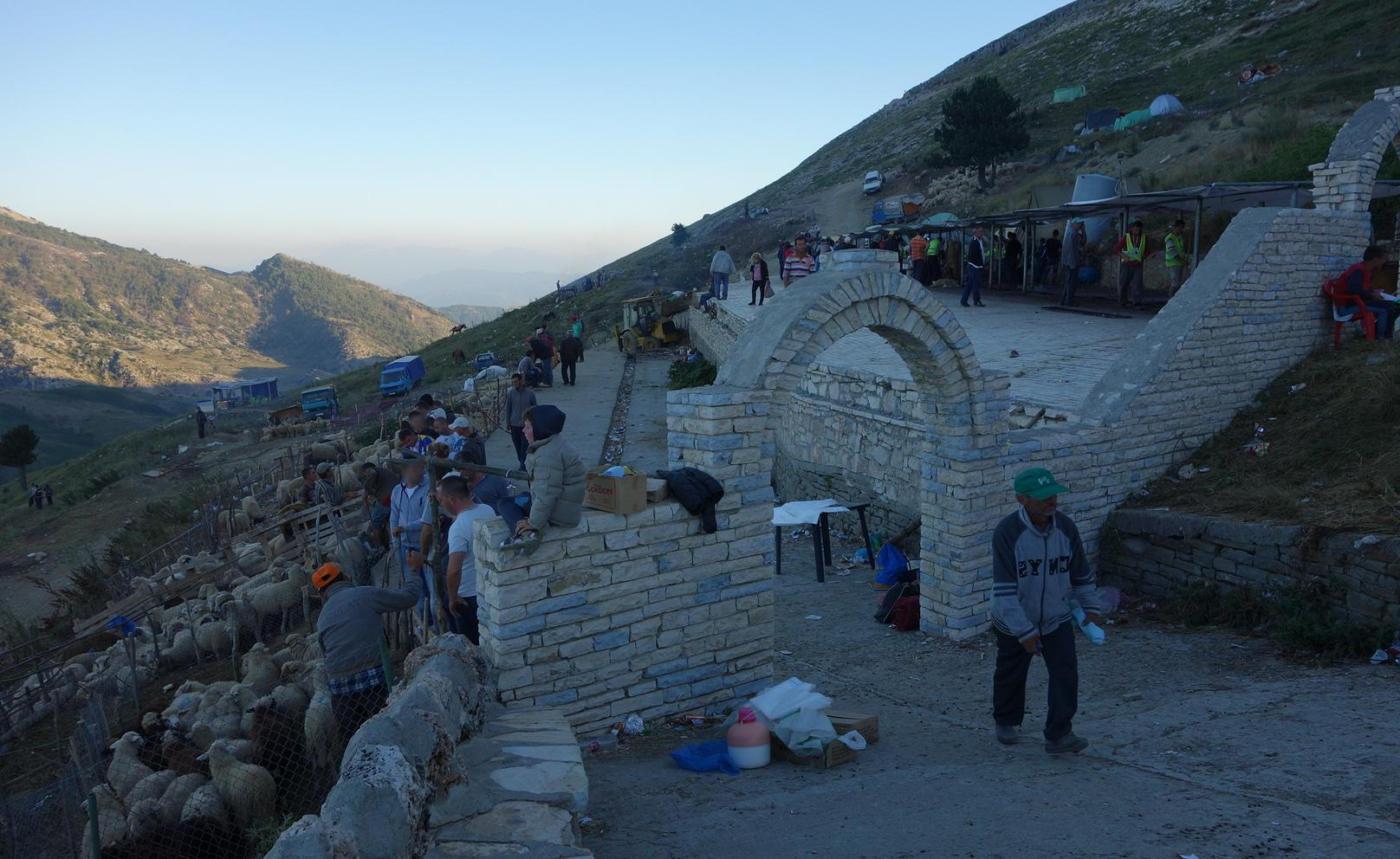
Pilgrimage scene on 23 August 2014

== Related sites ==
In Albania, there are several other sites with handprints and footprints attributed to Abbas ibn Ali.

- The handprint of Abbas Ali, in Burgullas, Skrapar
- The footprint of Abbas Ali, in Novaj, Skrapar
- The footprint of Abbas Ali, in Kajcë, near Prisht, Skrapar
- The footprint of Abbas Ali, in Rodhes, Skrapar
- The footprint of Abbas Ali, in Taronin, Çepan

== See also ==
- List of Bektashi tekkes and shrines
