= Ja'far ibn Ali =

Son of Ali ibn Abi Talib (died 680)

Ja'far ibn Ali جَعْفَر ٱبْن عَلِيّ
- Born: Medina, Rashidun Caliphate
- Died: 10 October 680 (10 Muharram 61 AH); Karbala, Umayyad Caliphate (present-day Iraq)
- Burial place: Imam Husayn Shrine, Karbala
- Parents: Ali (father); Umm al-Banin (mother)

Ja'far ibn Ali (Arabic: جَعْفَر ٱبْن عَلِيّ ٱبْن أَبِي طَالِب) was a son of Ali and Umm al-Banin. He was named by Ali after the latter's brother, Ja'far ibn Abi Talib. The younger Ja'far was one of the companions of Husayn in the Battle of Karbala, where he was martyred on Ashura alongside his brothers Abbas, Abdullah and Uthman. Abdullah and his brothers Abbas, Uthman, and Ja'far accompanied Husayn in his journey from Mecca to Kufa and were martyred at the Battle of Karbala. Their graves are in the mausoleum of the collective grave of the martyrs of Karbala in the Imam Husayn Shrine, a profoundly holy site in Shia Islam.

== See also ==
- Descendants of Ali ibn Abi Talib
- Ashura
- Tasu'a
- Sermon of Ali ibn Husayn in Damascus
- Ziyarat Ashura
- Battle of Karbala
- Abbas ibn Ali
- Shia view of Ali
