= Abbas ibn Ali =

Son of Ali ibn Abi Talib (died in 680)

Abbas ibn Ali Al-Hashmi الْعَبَّاس اِبِنْ عَلي
- Depiction of Abbas ibn Ali by Abolfazl Mirzabeygi
- Born: c. 4 Shaban 26 AH c. 15 May 647 CE; Medina, Rashidun Caliphate
- Died: 10 Muharram 61 AH; 10 October 680 (aged 33); Karbala, Umayyad Caliphate
- Cause of death: Killed in the Battle of Karbala
- Resting place: Al-Abbas Shrine, Karbala, Iraq
- Known for: Battle of Karbala
- Title: List of titles: Abu al-Fadl (أَبُو ٱلْفَضْل) (lit. 'father of virtue'); Qamar Bani Hashim (قَمَر بَنِي هَاشِم) (lit. 'moon of the Hashimites'); al-Saqqa (ٱلسَّقَىٰ) (lit. 'the water carrier'); Abu al-Qirba (أَبُو ٱلْقِرْبَة) (qirba means 'a water-skin'); Alam-dar (علمدار) ('lit. 'standard-bearer')
- Spouse: Lubaba bint Ubayd Allah ibn Abbas ibn Abd al-Muttalib
- Children: Ubayd Allah ibn Abbas; al-Fadl ibn Abbas; Muhammad ibn Abbas; Qasim ibn Abbas; Lubaba al-sughra bint Abbas
- Parents: Ali; Umm al-Banin
- Relatives: List of siblings: Hasan; Husayn; Zaynab; Umm Kulthum; Muhsin; Muhammad; Ruqayya; Abdullah; Uthman; Ja'far
- Family: Ahl al-Bayt

Al-Abbas ibn Ali ibn Abi Talib (Arabic: الْعَبَّاس اِبِنْ عَلي اِبِنْ أَبي طَالِبْ, c. 15 May 647 – 10 October 680 CE), also known by the kunya Abu al-Fadl (Arabic: أَبو الْفَضْل, lit. 'father of virtue'), was a son of Ali ibn Abi Talib, who was the fourth caliph in Sunni Islam (r. 656–661) and the first imam in Shia Islam. His mother was Fatima bint Hizam, commonly known as Umm al-Banin (Arabic: أُمّ ٱلْبَنِين, lit. 'mother of the sons'). Abbas fought as the standard-bearer of his half-brother Husayn ibn Ali in the Battle of Karbala on 10 Muharram 61 AH (10 October 680) against the army of the Umayyad caliph Yazid ibn Mu'awiya (r. 680–683). He was killed in a desperate attempt to bring water from the Euphrates river to quench the unbearable thirst of the besieged family of the Islamic prophet Muhammad.Abbas is said to have inherited Ali's boldness and bravery, and was praised by Shia imams for his faith and fortitude in defending Husayn. Abbas is regarded by Shia Muslims as an ultimate paragon of courage and self-sacrifice. The shrine of Abbas and the nearby mausoleum of Husayn in Karbala are destinations for pilgrimage.

== Titles ==
The kunya of Abbas was Abu al-Fadl (lit. 'father of virtue'). Another epithet of him was Qamar Bani Hashim (lit. 'moon of the Hashemites'), and he is often described as tall and handsome. Abbas is said to have inherited the boldness and bravery of his father Ali ibn Abi Talib, always carrying the victorious standard on the battlefield. Abbas is indeed celebrated as shir-i ghazi (lit. 'the warrior-lion') and shir-i awzhan (lit. 'the valiant lion') in Persian language. He is also known as Alam-d'ar (lit. 'standard-bearer') for his role in the Battle of Karbala, and as al-Saqqa' (lit. 'the water carrier') and Abu al-Qirba (qirba means 'a water-skin') for his desperate attempt on the evening of Ashura to bring water from the Euphrates river to quench the unbearable thirst of the besieged Ahl al-Bayt. The Islamicist J. Calmard draws a parallel between Abbas and Muhammad ibn al-Hanafiyya, an elder son of Ali and his standard-bearer, saying that Abbas fulfilled the same warrior functions near Husayn.

== Birth and early life ==
Abbas was born in Medina to Ali and Fatima bint Hizam ibn Khalid ibn Rabi'a, a woman from the Banu Kilab tribe. Abbas had three full brothers, named Abd Allah, Ja'far and Uthman. Their mother Fatima thus became known as Umm al-Banin (lit. 'mother of the sons'). Abbas' brothers were all killed in the Battle of Karbala just before him. Some sources refer to him as al-Abbas al-Akbar (lit. 'the elder/greater Abbas') to distinguish him from another son of Ali, named al-Abbas al-Asghar (lit. 'the younger/smaller Abbas'). Abbas' date of birth is disputed. According to the Sunni historian Ibn Sa'd (d. 845), he had not yet reached puberty when Ali was assassinated in 661, whereas some others have written that Abbas was thirty-four at that time. The Shia scholar Bahr al-Ulum (d. 1797) reports 4 Shaban 26 (15 May 647) as the birthdate of Abbas. Naturally, much of what exists in sources about Abbas is in connection to the Battle of Karbala. Most scholars record that Abbas was a teenage youth from the ages of 12-14 in 657. A few scholarly sources, particularly in the Shi’a tradition cite that Abbas ibn Ali fought alongside his father and brother in the 657 Battle of Siffin, during which Abbas was a young teenager. The sources record that, Abbas ibn Ali, alongside his brothers Muhammad ibn al-Hanafiyyah, Hasan, and Husayn, charged into the battlefield on a horse while concealing his face with a veil. It is said that he slew several enemies of the Umayyad Syrian forces led by Muawiya and fought with such bravery and valour that many soldiers of the opposing army thought that he was Ali himself; and were very intimidated by the young masked warrior. Upon witnessing his son fighting with such bravery and fearlessness, Ali called out to Abbas: “Return back, my Ghazi.” The word ‘Ghazi’ is an epithet used almost exclusively to address Abbas ibn Ali, and it translates in Arabic to ‘a warrior who returns alive and victorious from the battlefield’. Shia sources record that, perhaps this is where the epithet of Abbas originated.

== Battle of Karbala and death (680) ==
Entrance to the shrine of Abbas

=== Accession of Yazid ===
In an appointment that violated earlier agreements with Ali's eldest son Hasan, the Umayyad caliph Mu'awiya (r. 661–680) designated his son Yazid (r. 680–683) as his successor in 676. Yazid is often presented by Muslim historians as a debaucher who openly violated the Islamic norms, and his nomination was indeed met with resistance at the time from sons of some prominent companions of the Islamic prophet Muhammad, including Husayn ibn Ali. On Mu'awiya's death and Yazid's accession in 680, the latter instructed the governor of Medina to secure Husayn's pledge of allegiance by force, and Husayn immediately left for Mecca to avoid recognizing Yazid as the caliph. He was accompanied by some relatives, including Abbas.

=== Journey to Karbala ===
After receiving letters of support from Kufans, whose intentions were confirmed by his cousin Muslim ibn Aqil, Husayn left Mecca for Kufa on 8 or 10 Dhu al-Hijja (10 or 12 September 680), accompanied by few relatives and supporters. A tradition attributed to Husayn identifies his intention as fighting the tyranny of Yazid, even though it would cost his life, as reported in al-Irshad, a biographical work by the prominent Shia scholar al-Mufid (d. 1022). Husayn similarly wrote in his will for his brother Ibn Hanafiyya that he had not set out to seek "corruption or oppression" but rather to "enjoin what is right and forbid what is wrong." At any rate, on their way to Kufa, Husayn's small caravan was intercepted by Yazid's army and forced to camp in the desert land of Karbala on 2 Muharram 61 (2 October 680) away from water and fortifications. The promised Kufan support did not materialize as the new governor of Kufa, Ubayd Allah ibn Ziyad (d. 686), killed the envoy of Husayn and intimidated Kufan tribal chiefs.

=== Water shortage ===
On 7 Muharram, on orders of Ibn Ziyad, the Umayyad commander Umar ibn Sa'd (d. 686) cut off Husayn's access to the Euphrates river. Abbas and some fifty companions were nevertheless able to bring back some water to Husayn's camp in a night sortie. Despite this attempt, the Islamicist L. Veccia Vaglieri (d. 1989) believes that the camp suffered from thirst for three days. Among other experts, D. Pinault similarly writes that the camp suffered from thirst and hunger during the siege, and the opinion of A. Hamdar is close. Karbala has a hot desert climate.

=== Negotiations ===
Ibn Sa'd was instructed by Ibn Ziyad not to let Husayn leave unless he pledged his allegiance to Yazid. Husayn did not submit to Yazid, but negotiated with Ibn Ziyad through Ibn Sa'd to be allowed to retreat and avoid bloodshed. The governor did not relent, however, and finally ordered Ibn Sa'd to fight, kill, and disfigure Husayn and his supporters unless they pledged allegiance to Yazid, in which case their fate would be decided later.

=== Safe passage ===
As a member of the Banu Kilab, the Umayyad commander Shamir ibn Dhi al-Jawshan acquired safe passage for Abbas and his three (full) brothers from Ibn Ziyad. According to the early historian Abu Mikhnaf (d. 773–774), Ibn Ziyad's letter of protection was sent to Abbas and his brothers, who refused it, "God's protection is better than the one offered by Sumayya's son [Ibn Ziyad]." Shamir extended again this offer to Abbas and his brothers on the eve of the battle, but they remained defiant and pledged their full support to Husayn.

=== Tasu'a ===
Ibn Sa'd decided to attack on Tasu'a (9 Muharram) after the afternoon prayer. As the Umayyad army approached, however, Husayn dispatched Abbas and some companions, who requested Ibn Sa'd to delay the confrontation until the following day. Husayn now beseeched his followers in a speech to leave and not risk their lives for his sake, after which Abbas was the first to renew his support, saying that he would follow his brother in life or death. Nearly all those present stayed with Husayn until the end. Husayn and his companions spent that night praying and reading the Quran, as reported by the Shia jurist Ibn Tawus (d. 1266) and in most maqatil works. On this night, Zaynab bint Ali is said to have reminded her half-brother Abbas of their father's wish for the latter to be the reserves of Karbala, and to be to Husayn as Ali was to Muhammad. This Abbas confirmed and swore to do. There is a report by Ibn Tawus that Abbas was killed on Tasu'a in a failed sally to bring water, though most traditions place his death on Ashura.

=== Ashura ===
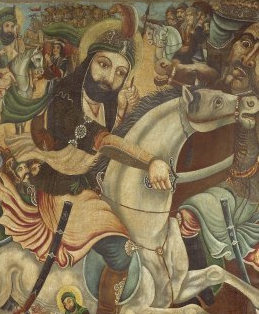
Abbas, riding a white horse in the Battle of Karbala, oil on canvas, c. 1868–1933

On the morning of Ashura (10 Muharram), Husayn organized his supporters, some seventy-two men, and designated Abbas as his standard-bearer, an indication of his privileged position among the companions. Husayn then spoke to the enemy lines and asked them why they considered it lawful to kill the grandson of Muhammad. The Umayyad commander al-Hurr ibn Yazid al-Tamimi defected to Husayn's side, probably after this speech. The Umayyad army then showered the camp with arrows, thus commencing the battle which lasted from morning till sunset and consisted of incidents of single combat, skirmishes, assaults, and retreats. On one occasion, Abbas helped rescue a group of companions who were surrounded by enemy horsemen. By the early afternoon, however, the companions had all fallen and were followed by the Banu Hashim.

=== Death ===
The Sunni historians al-Tabari (d. 923) and al-Baladhuri (d. 892) are silent in their works about the details of Abbas' death. Veccia Vaglieri, however, argues that there must have existed traditions about his death and that those were reported by al-Mufid, to the effect that Abbas and Husayn were separated when they attempted to reach the Euphrates in the ultimate episode of the battle, adding that Abbas fought valiantly until the end. Another well-known account is reported by the Shia scholar Ibn Tawus and some others: Perhaps anguished by the cries of Husayn's thirsty children, Abbas set out for the Euphrates on the eve of Ashura and managed to fill his water-skin, but was blocked by the enemy near the river bank, far from Husayn's camp. Fighting alone, both his arms were severed and he was then killed. When Husayn's last warrior fell, the Umayyad army converged on the lone imam, who also fought until the end. The account by the Sufi scholar H. Kashefi (d. 1504) in his Rawzat al-shohada differs in that it places Abbas as the sixty-eighth casualty before Mohammad ibn Ali, Ali al-Akbar, and Ali al-Asghar. Zayd ibn Varqa' Hanafi and Hakim ibn al-Tofayl San'ani are named as the murderers of Abbas in al-Irshad. Abu Mikhnaf in his Maqtal adds that Husayn wept bitterly when his brother fell. Maqatil al-Talibiyyin by the early historian Abu al-Faraj al-Isfahani (d. 967) reports that the murderer of Abbas dreamed of being flung into hell every night, while reports attributed to the Shia imams Ali ibn al-Husayn (d. 713) and Ja'far al-Sadiq (d. 765) highly praise Abbas for his faith and fortitude in defending Husayn.

==== Credibility ====
Among others, al-Mufid argues that Abbas' burial place, far from Husayn and his companions, adds to the credibility of this account, which is also corroborated by another report about Abbas' death attributed to Ali ibn al-Husayn. In support of this account, the Islamicist A. Bahramian and his co-author note that the traditional supplications for pilgrims contain references to Abbas' mission to fetch water and his arms being severed. The two authors also note that Abbas later became known as al-Saqqa' (lit. 'the water carrier') and Abu al-Qirba (qirba means 'a water-skin').

==== After his death ====
After the battle, some Umayyad soldiers stripped Abbas' garments, and his corpse was thus dishonored. As with Husayn and his other companions, the head of Abbas was severed and brought to Yazid in Damascus, in his case by Harmala ibn K'ahil al-Asadi.

== Shrine ==
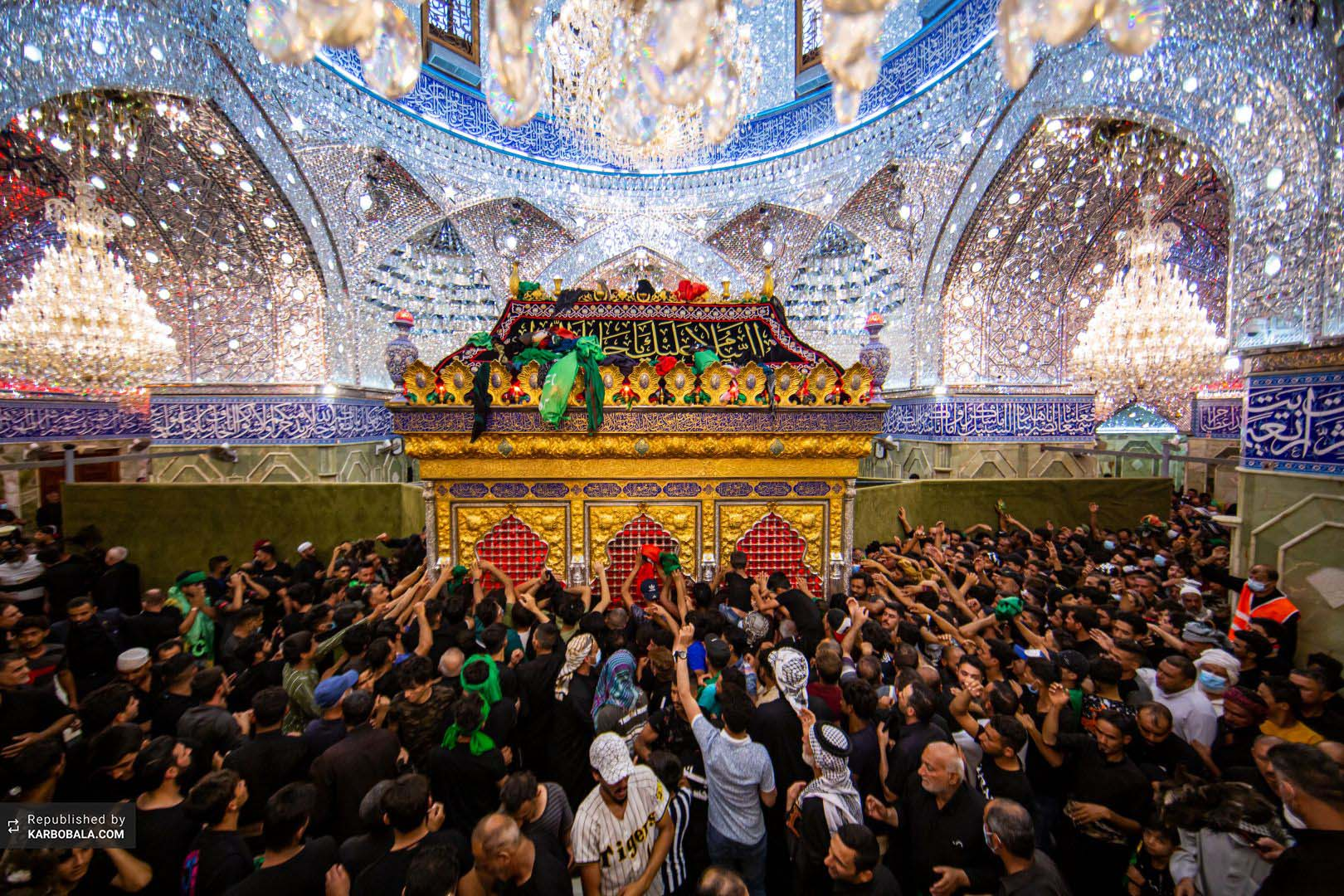
The tomb of Abbas in the center, surrounded by pilgrims

Abbas was buried by some men of the Banu Asad tribe from nearby al-Ghadiriyya village, at the same place where he was killed. A tomb was later erected over his grave. Abbas' shrine now has a golden dome and is located to the north-east of Husayn's mausoleum. Both shrines are built on a mound overlooking the city of Karbala, which has become a destination for pilgrimage and a center for religious learning. There exist special prayers and rituals for pilgrims and several Muslim figures are buried in the precinct of Abbas' shrine. There are also other shrines associated with Abbas elsewhere, including an old shrine near Tehran, considered by the locals to be the tomb of Abd Allah ibn Abbas.

== Descendants ==
Abbas had a young son named Ubayd Allah, born to Lubaba bint Ubayd Allah, the granddaughter of Abbas ibn Abd al-Muttalib. This son was likely taken captive after the Battle of Karbala, and the lineage of Abbas continued through him. In particular, the poetry by Abbas' descendants is collected in one of the chapters in al-Awraq by the Abbasid-era author al-Suli (d. 946–947). One of his descendants was Abbas ibn al-Hasan al-Alawi, who reached fame as a poet and scholar during the reigns of the Abbasid caliphs, al-Rashid (r. 786–809) and al-Ma'mun (r. 813–833). The Zanj rebellion was ignited in Iraq and Bahrain in the ninth century by Ali ibn Muhammad Sahib al-Zanj, who claimed descent from Abbas. However, this claim has been disputed by some historians.

== Significance in Shia Islam ==
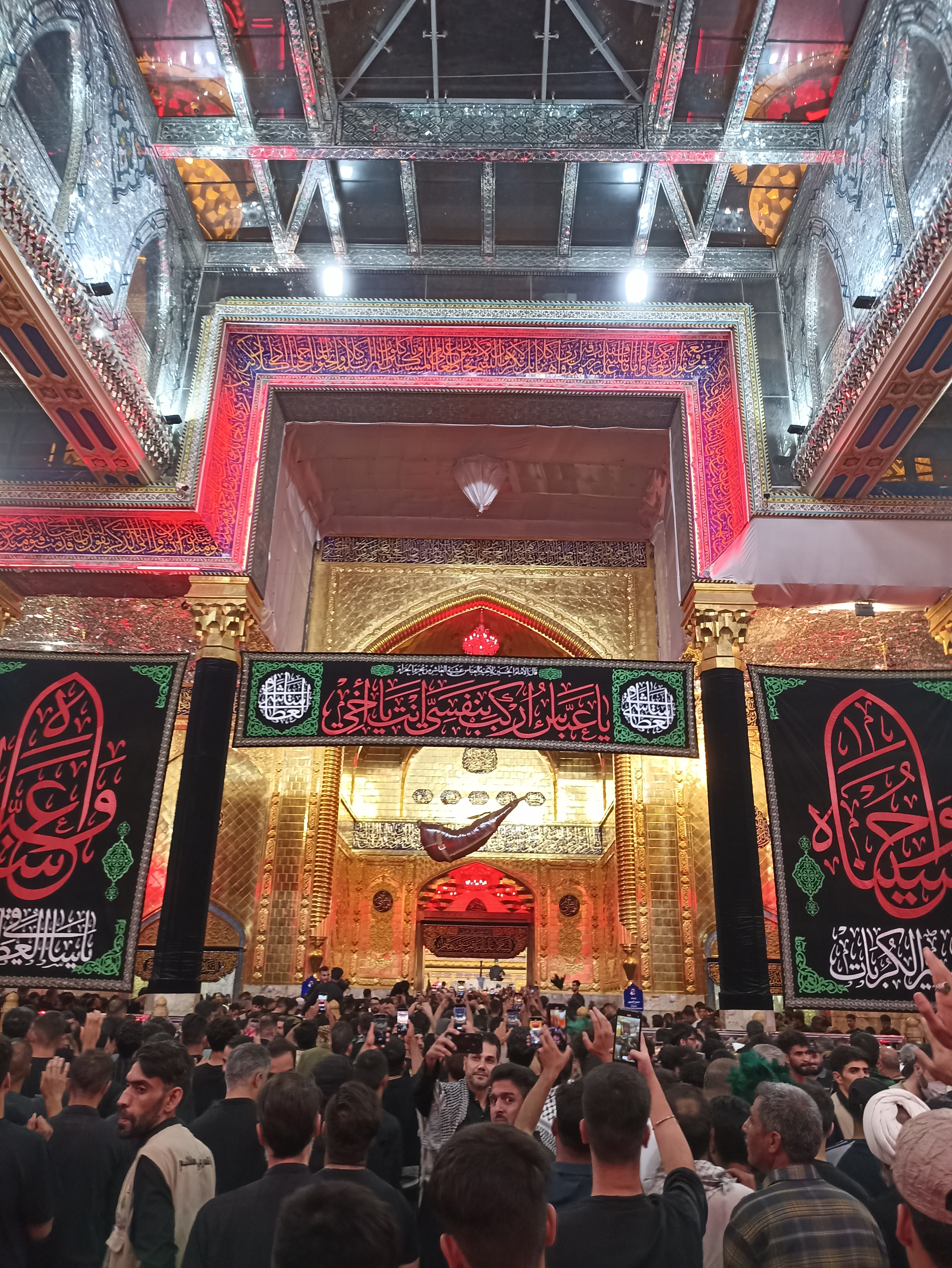
The shrine of Abbas ibn Ali on the night of Arbaeen al-Hussaini Karbala

Abbas is regarded in Shia Islam as an ultimate paragon of courage, chivalry, love, sincerity, and self-sacrifice. Shias make the supplication of tawassul to Abbas, thus requesting him to join his prayers with them. Abbas is thus associated in Shia with the alleviation of grief and suffering. Serious oaths are made in his name, and Shias distribute food for charity as part of vows (nadhrs) made in the name of Abbas.

=== Muharram rituals ===
Tasu'a (9 Muharram) is devoted in Shia as the day of mourning for Abbas. He is celebrated in ta'ziyeh performances as the water carrier of the Ahl al-Bayt and the standard bearer of Husayn. The ta'zie of Abbas' death is among the oldest passion-plays and is frequently performed throughout the year. The green standards (alams) carried in Muharram processions are often adorned on top with a metal hand (panja) representing Abbas' severed hand, with outstretched fingers that symbolize the Ahl al-Bayt. They are engraved with the invocations such as Ya hazrat-e Abbas (lit. 'O, exalted Abbas') or Ya Abu al-Fadl. Food and water are also distributed for charity in his name. From West Indies to the island of Java, Sunnis and Hindus also commonly participate in most Shia Muharram rituals.

=== Religious art ===
Abbas is heavily featured in Shia art. Verses of poetry about him and his likeness historically appear in public religious buildings, particularly in the tile work (kashik'ari) of saqqa-khanas (public drinking-water repositories), husayniyyas and takiyyas (both are places to commemorate Husayn), and zur-khanahs (traditional Persian gymnasiums). Abbas is depicted in religious paintings often seated on a white horse and holding Husayn's banner while fighting enemies or holding a water-skin and surrounded by the womenfolk and children of the Ahl al-Bayt.

== Significance in Bektashism ==
According to the traditions of the Bektashi Order, a Sufi community based primarily in Albania, Abbas ibn Ali (Albanian: Abaz Aliu) went to Albania on a white horse to save it from the barbarians and continues to return to Mount Tomorr in Albania for five days (August 20–25) each year, during which animal sacrifices are made and homage is paid to Abbas. During these five days, Bektashi pilgrims visit the Abbas Ali Türbe, a mausoleum (Albanian: mekam) believed to house the remains of Abbas. The mausoleum is located on the southern peak of the Mount Tomorr, which was originally constructed in 1620. The mausoleum lies adjacent to the Bektashi tekke on Mount Tomorr, which was built in 1916.

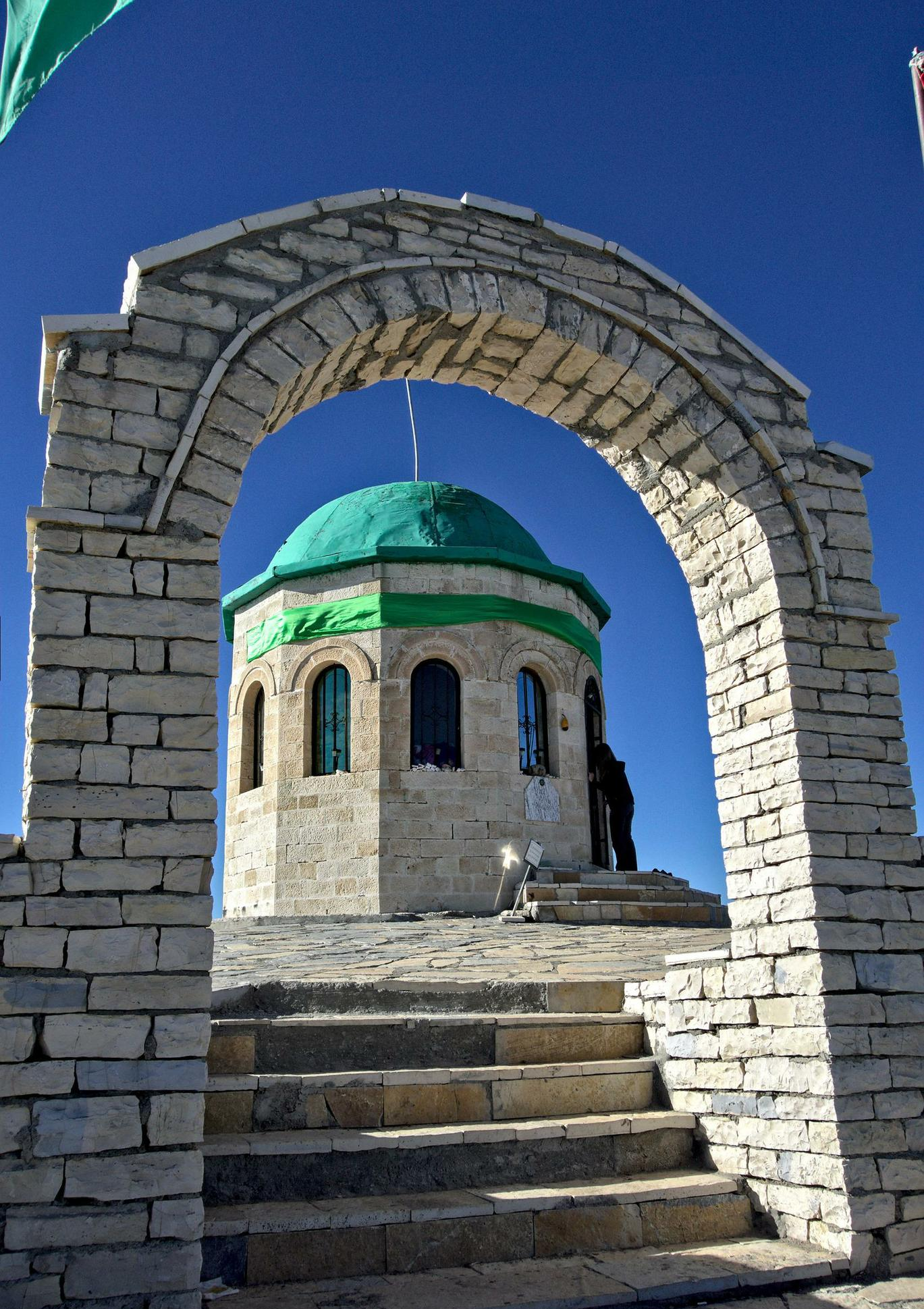
Abbas Ali Türbe

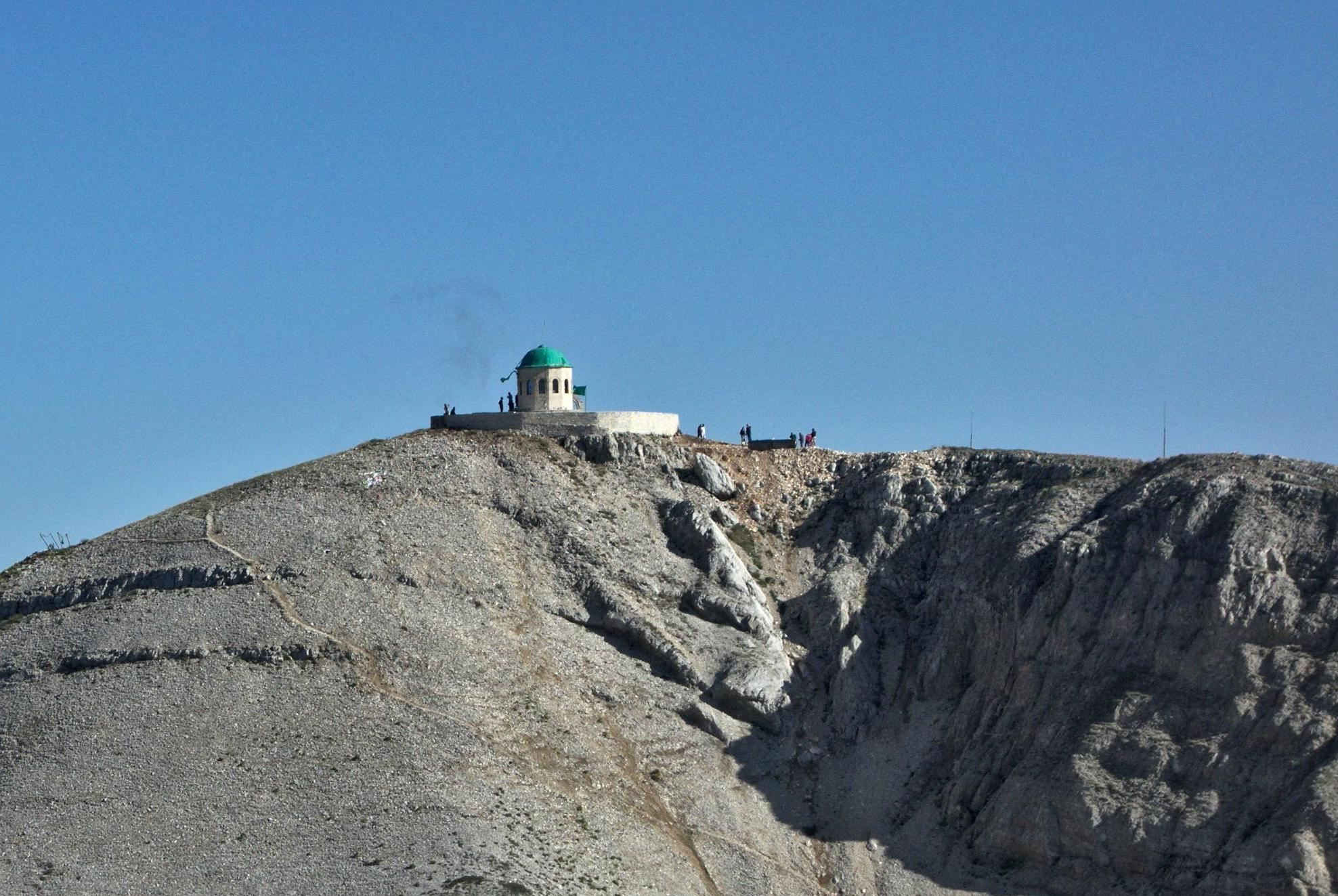
Abbas Ali Türbe

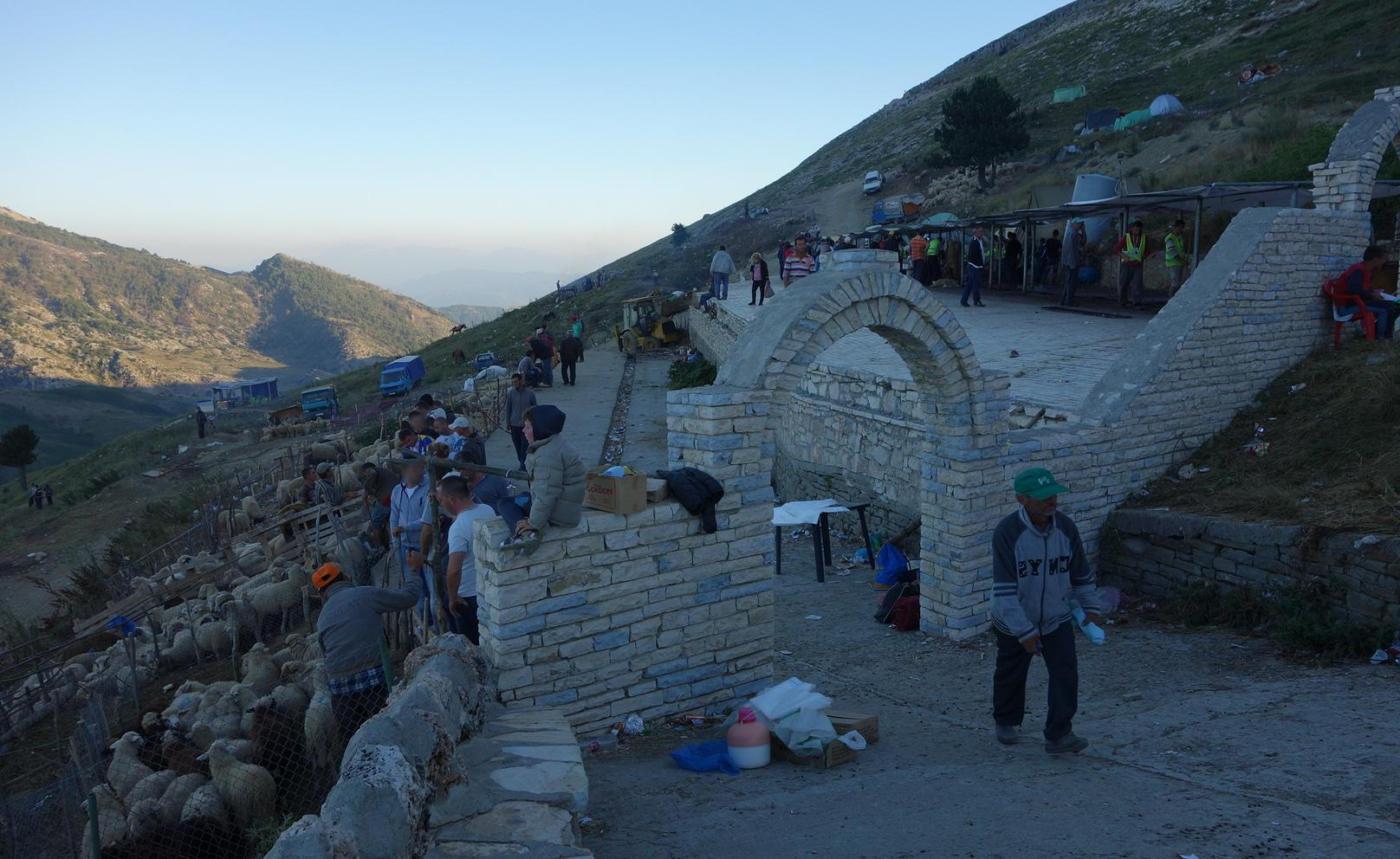
Pilgrimage scene in 2014

== See also ==
- Husayn ibn Ali
- Battle of Karbala

== Sources ==
- Abbas, H. (2021). The Prophet's Heir: The Life of Ali ibn Abi Talib. Yale University Press. ISBN 9780300252057.
- Adibzadeh, S. (2013). The Journey of Beauty Towards Perfection: Zaynab bint 'Alī Ibn Abī Tālib and the Model of Human Changes Towards Developing Attributes of Walīyat Allāh and al-Insān al-Kāmil (Thesis). Temple University.
- Aghaie, K.S. (2004). The Martyrs of Karbala: Shi'i Symbols and Rituals in Modern Iran. University of Washington Press. ISBN 0295984554.
- Bahramian, A.; Bulookbashi, A.A. (2015). "Al-'Abbās b. 'Alī". In Madelung, W.; Daftary, F. (eds.). Encyclopaedia Islamica. Translated by Negahban, F. doi:10.1163/1875-9831_isla_COM_0009.
- Calmard, J. (1982). "'Abbās b. 'Alī b. Abū Ṭāleb". Encyclopaedia Iranica. Vol. I/1. pp. 77–79. ISSN 2330-4804.
- Elsie, R. (2019). The Albanian Bektashi: History and Culture of a Dervish Order in the Balkans. I.B. Tauris. ISBN 9781788315692.
- Hamdar, A. (2009). "Jihad of words: Gender and contemporary Karbala Narratives". The Yearbook of English Studies. 39 (1–2): 84–100. doi:10.1353/yes.2009.0016.
- Hawting, G.R. (2000). The First Dynasty of Islam: The Umayyad Caliphate AD 661–750 (Second ed.). Routledge. ISBN 0415240727.
- Howard, I.K.A. (1986). "Husayn the Martyr: A Commentary on the Accounts of the Martyrdom in Arabic Sources". Al-Serāt: Papers from the Imam Ḥusayn Conference, London, July 1984. Vol. 12. London: The Muhammadi Trust of Great Britain and Northern Ireland. pp. 124–142. ISBN 9780710302076.
- Hyder, A. (2006). Reliving Karbala: Martyrdom in South Asian Memory. Oxford University Press. ISBN 9780195373028.
- Madelung, W. (1997). The Succession to Muhammad: A Study of the Early Caliphate. Cambridge University Press. ISBN 9780521561815.
- Madelung, W. (2004). "Ḥosayn b. 'Ali i. Life and Significance in Shi'ism". Encyclopaedia Iranica. Vol. XII/5. pp. 493–498.
- Momen, M. (1985). An Introduction to Shi'i Islam. Yale University Press. ISBN 9780300035315.
- Munson, H. (1988). Islam and Revolution in the Middle East. Yale University Press. ISBN 0300041276.
- Pinault, D. (2000). "Zaynab bin 'Ali and the Place of the Women of the Households of the First Imāms in Shī'ite Devotional Literature". In Hambly, G. (ed.). Women in the Medieval Islamic World: Power, Patronage, and Piety. Macmillan. ISBN 9780333800355.
- Pinault, D. (2001). Horse of Karbala: Muslim Devotional Life in India. Palgrave. ISBN 0312216378.
- Popovic, A. (1999). The Revolt of African Slaves in Iraq, in the 3rd/9th Century. Translated by King, L. Markus Wiener Publishers. ISBN 1558761624.
- Qutbuddin, T. (2019). "Orations of Zaynab and Umm Kulthūm in the aftermath of Ḥusayn's Martyrdom at Karbala: Speaking Truth to Power". In Korangy, A.; Rouhi, L. (eds.). The "Other" Martyrs: Women and the Poetics of Sexuality, Sacrifice, and Death in World Literatures (First ed.). Harrassowitz Verlag. pp. 103–132. doi:10.2307/j.ctvrnfq6q. ISBN 9783447198790.
- Sindawi, K. (2002). "The Image of Ḥusayn ibn 'Alī in Maqātil Literature" (PDF). Quaderni di Studi Arabi. 20/21: 79–104. JSTOR 25802958.
- Tabatabai, S.M.H. (1975). Shi'ite Islam. Translated by Nasr, S.H. State University of New York Press. ISBN 0873953908.
- Veccia Vaglieri, L. (2012). "(al-)Ḥusayn b. 'Alī b. Abī Ṭālib". In Bearman, P.; Bianquis, Th.; Bosworth, C.E.; van Donzel, E.; Heinrichs, W.P. (eds.). Encyclopaedia of Islam (Second ed.). doi:10.1163/1573-3912_islam_COM_0304. ISBN 9789004161214.
- Wellhausen, J. (1901). Die Religiös-Politischen Oppositionsparteien im Alten Islam (in German). Weidmannsche Buchhandlung. OCLC 453206240.
- Wellhausen, J. (1927). The Arab Kingdom and Its Fall. Translated by Weir, M.G. University of Calcutta. OCLC 752790641.
