= Uthman ibn Ali =

Son of ʿAlī ibn Abī Ṭālib (died 680)

Uthman ibn Ali عثمان بن علی

Personal life
- Born: 659 AD / 39 AH Kufa, Rashidun Caliphate
- Died: 10th of Muharram, 61 A.H. / 10 October, 680 AD Karbala, Umayyad Caliphate
- Cause of death: Killed in the Battle of Karbala
- Resting place: Imam Husayn Shrine, Karbala, Iraq
- Parents: Ali (father); Umm al-Banin (mother)
- Known for: Being a companion of Husayn ibn Ali

Religious life
- Religion: Islam

Uthman ibn Ali (Arabic: عُثْمان اِبِنْ عَلي) was a son of Ali and Umm al-Banin. He fought in the Battle of Karbala alongside his brother Husayn, in which he was martyred. Uthman is highly honored by Muslims for his sacrifice. According to some sources Uthman was 21 and had no children when he was martyred.

Uthman and his brothers Abbas, Abdullah, and Ja'far accompanied Husayn in his journey from Mecca to Kufa and were martyred at the Battle of Karbala. Their graves are in the mausoleum of the collective grave of the martyrs of Karbala in the Imam Husayn Shrine, a profoundly holy site in Shia Islam.

== Biography ==
He was the son of Ali and Fatima bint Hizam. Apparently, 'Uthman did not get married and had no children. In a Shi'a narration, Ali named his son Uthman after Uthman ibn Maz'un.

Uthman's mother, Fatima, was the daughter of Hizam ibn Khalid ibn Rabi'a from the Arab tribe of Banu Kilab. She was the mother of three more sons of Ali, namely Abbas, Abdullah, and Ja'far, and for this reason she became known as Umm al-Banin.

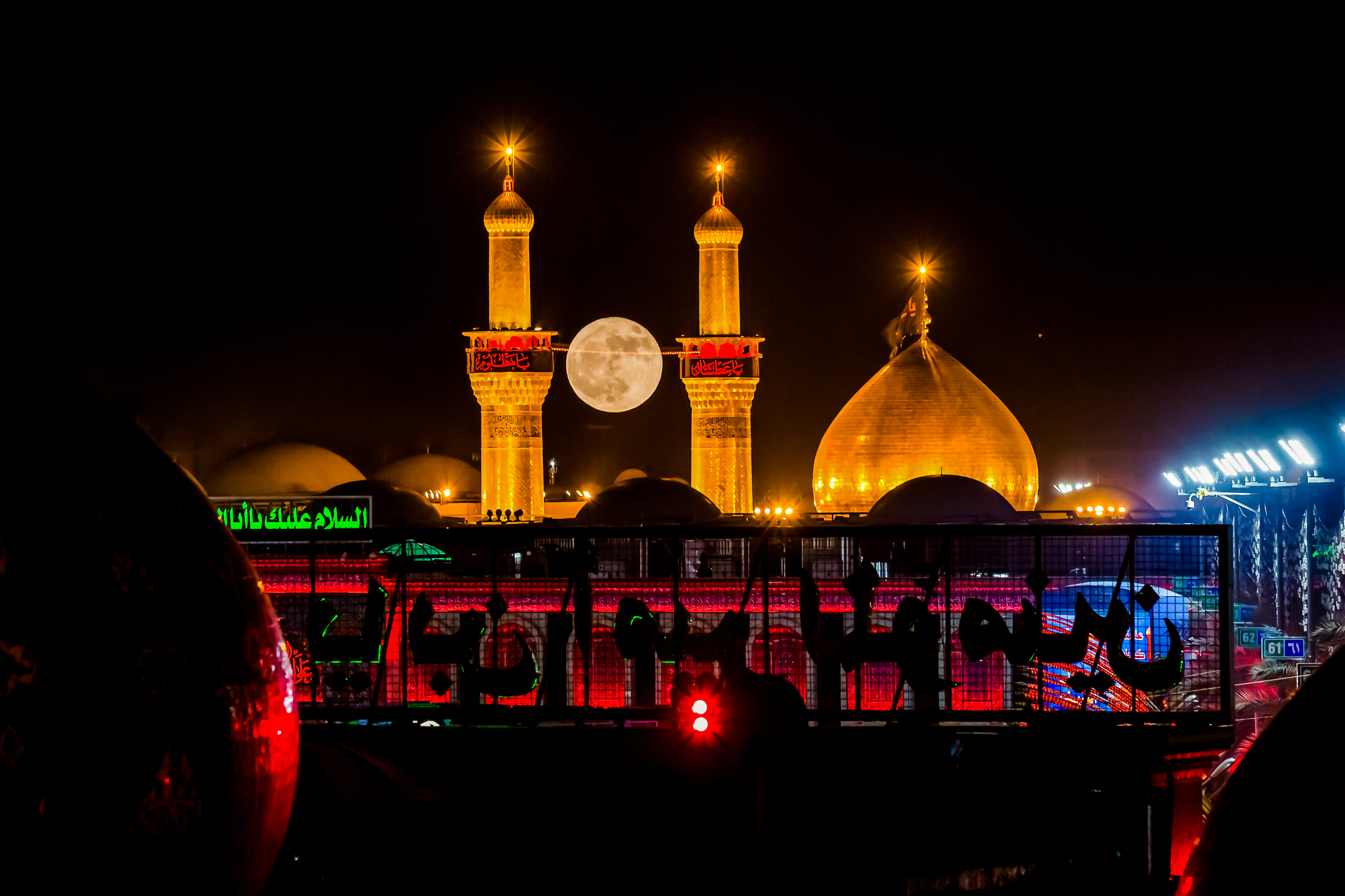
Imam Husayn Shrine in Karbala, where Uthman is also buried, is a profoundly holy site in Shia Islam.

=== Death ===
Uthman went to the battlefield saying: "I am Uthman the possessor of glory, my master is Ali the executor of virtuous deeds, this is Husayn the master of fairness, the master of the young and old". Khawli ibn Yazid al-Asbahi shot an arrow at Uthman's forehead resulting in him falling off his horse. Then a man from the Banu Darim tribe beheaded him.

Uthman ibn Ali was 21 years old when he was killed on the day of Ashura. His grave is in the shrine of Husayn.
