= Kulmak =

Mountain in Albania

- Mali i Kulmakut
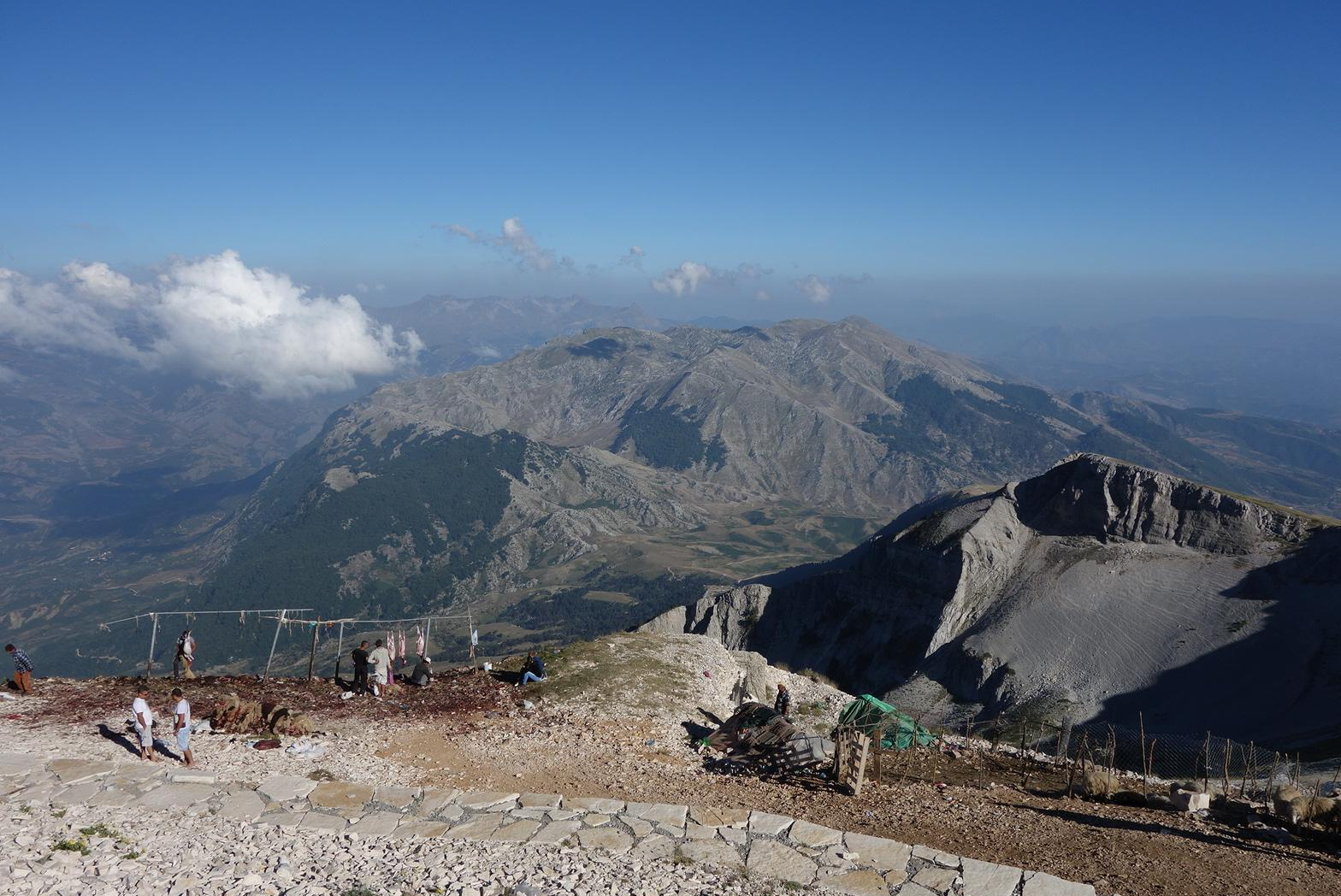
- View of Kulmak

Highest point
- Elevation: 2,173 m (7,129 ft)
- Prominence: 721 m (2,365 ft)
- Isolation: 20 m (66 ft)
- Coordinates: 40°34′35″N 20°15′02″E

Naming
- English translation: Bulrush

Geography
- Location within Albania
- Country: Albania
- Region: Southern Mountain Region
- Municipality: Skrapar
- Parent range: Tomorr-Kulmak-Miçan

Geology
- Rock age(s): Cretaceous, Paleogene
- Mountain type: mountain
- Rock type(s): limestone, flysch

Kulmak (lit. 'Bulrush'), also known as Mali i Zaloshnjës, is a mountain located in the municipality of Skrapar, in south-central Albania. Part of the Tomorr–Kulmak–Miçan mountain range, its highest peaks include Kulmaku 2,173 m (7,129 ft), Ramia 2,172 m (7,126 ft) and Kakruka 2,161 m (7,090 ft).

== Geology ==
Composed primarily of Cretaceous and Paleogene limestone, along with flysch, the mountain features a varied relief, broken with steep slopes in the east and gradual inclines in the west. The ridge of Kulmak is flat, full of karst formations, pits and funnels. Sections of the mountain contain expansive flatlands and meadows lush with summer pastures.

== Biodiversity ==
Vegetation is scarce at heights above 1,700 m (5,600 ft), mainly consisting of black juniper, ash and hazel.

== See also ==
- List of mountains in Albania
