= Tomorr =

Mountain chain in south-central Albania

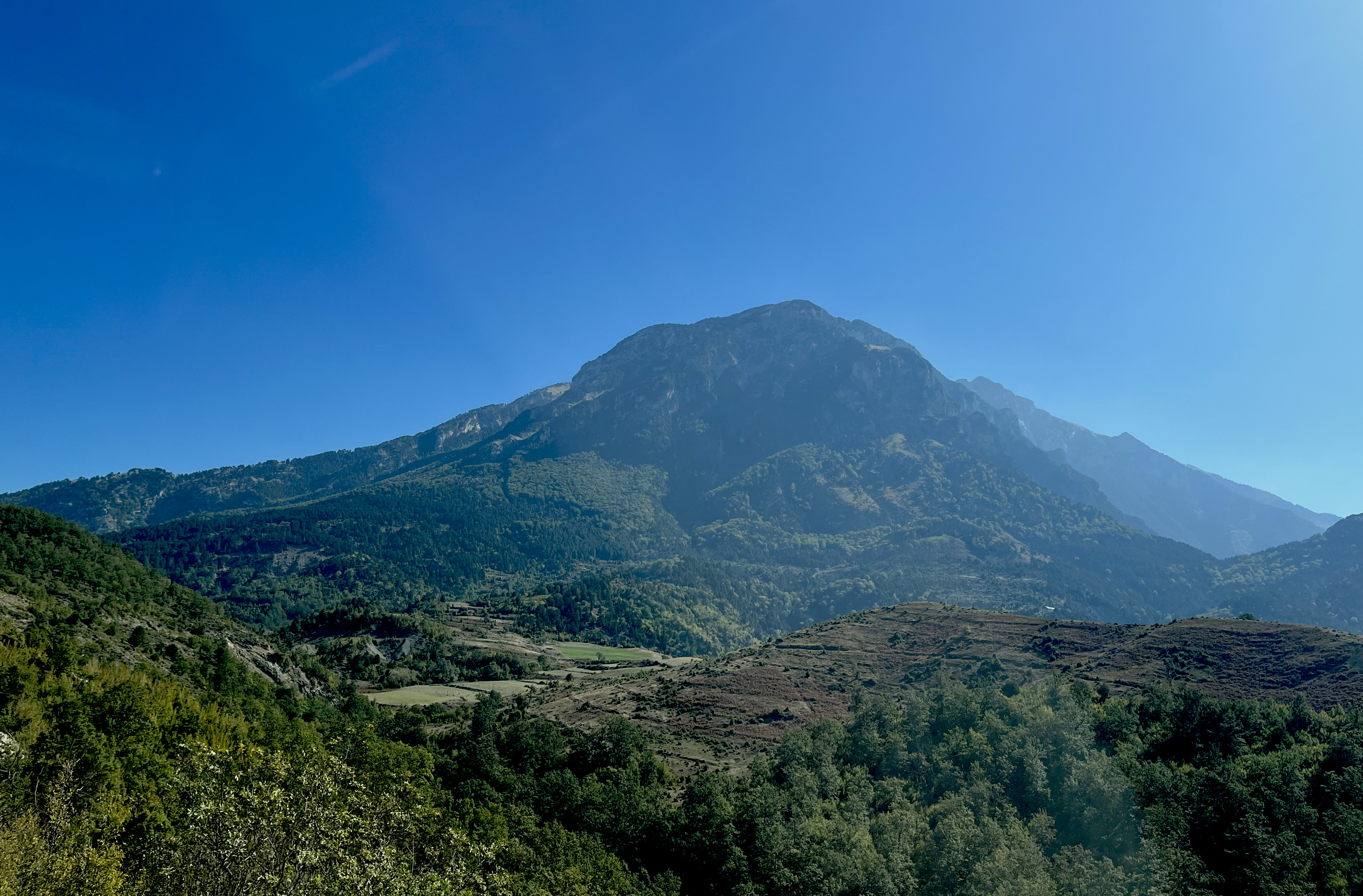
- View of Tomorr

Highest point
- Peak: Çuka e Partizanit
- Elevation: 2,417 m (7,930 ft)
- Prominence: 1,449 m (4,754 ft)
- Isolation: 66.2 km (41.1 mi)
- Listing: Ribu
- Coordinates: 40°42′0″N 20°8′0″E

Geography
- Location within Albania
- Location: Skrapar, Albania
- Parent range: Tomorr massif

Geology
- Mountain type: Limestone

Tomorr is a mountain chain in the region of Berat and Skrapar, in Albania. It reaches an elevation of 2,416 metres (7,927 ft) above sea level at the Çuka e Partizanit, which is the highest peak in central Albania.

Mount Tomorr is one of Albania's biggest water-collecting areas. Tomorr is situated within the Tomorr National Park, which is noted for its diverse species of deciduous and coniferous trees and a great variety of flora. Many endangered species are free to roam and live in this area such as bears (Ursus arctos), wolf (Canis lupus), and birds of prey.

Tomorr is a holy mountain for Albanians, and it is a site where annual pilgrimages take place during the second half of August. Along with St. Anthony's Catholic Church in Laç, Mount Tomorr is the most frequented sacred place in Albania. Mount Tomorr is associated with Baba Tomor and Zojz by Albanian folk beliefs, with Abbas Ali by Bektashis and with Virgin Mary by Christians.

Mount Tomorr offers various sports such as hiking, horse or donkey riding, canoeing, and skiing.

== Name and history ==
The Albanian Tomor(r) derives from the Illyrian Tómaros, from Proto-Indo-European *tómh_{x}es-, "dark".

Illyrians called the mountain Tómaros. It was the most prominent mountain in southern Illyria. The mountain has been connected by modern scholars to Mount Amyron (Greek: Άμυρον), recorded by Stephanus of Byzantium (6th century AD) citing Hecataeus of Miletus (6th century BC). In the passage, it is reported that the Dexaroi, a Chaonian tribe, dwelled under this mountain. The mountain was probably located in a region that in Roman times was called Dassaretis. However, all these hypothetical connections remain uncertain. Vibius Sequester (4th or 5th century AD) records the mountain with the name Tomarus, and locates it in the Roman province of Macedonia, near Apollonia.

Among Byzantine authors the mountain was known as Tmoros (Greek: Τμόρος) or Timoros (Greek: Τίμορος). During the reign of Byzantine Emperor Basil II, the sons of Bulgarian Tsar Ivad Vladislav fled in Tomorr to continue the war against the Byzantines after the collapse of First Bulgarian Empire in 1018, but soon surrendered as they reached an agreement and received great privileges. The last Bulgarian governor of Berat was an Elimagos. The 13th century was a series of changes in the region. Manfred of Sicily and then Angevine Albania after 1271–72 held control of the area. The fortress of Tomorr in the early 14th century is attested as Timoro(n) under Byzantine control. In 1337, the Albanian tribes which lived in the areas of Belegrita (the region of Mt. Tomorr) and Kanina rose in rebellion, and seized the fortress of Tomorr. There is little detail about the rebellion in primary sources. John VI Kantakouzenos mentions that the Albanians in those areas rebelled despite the privileges which Andronikos III Palaiologos had given them a few years earlier. These events marked the movement of these Albanian tribes into Epirus for the first time. Andronikos led an army mainly composed of Turkish mercenaries, and defeated the Albanians, killing many and taking prisoners.

In the 15th century the region of Mount Tomorr was interested in the Albanian-Ottoman Wars. All the local chieftains on both sides of the Tomorr mountain range were loyal to Skanderbeg. In 1457 the Turks appear to have occupied a number of Albanian valleys. An Ottoman army under the leadership of Firuz Bey and Mihaloglu Ali Bey was sent westward and fought against the Albanian forces under Skanderbeg in the mountains of Albania in order to take possession of Kruje, Svetigrad and Berat. In Tomorr Skanderbeg won his bloodiest but also most brilliant victory on September 2, 1457. When Skanderbeg attacked Isa Bey's resting army, the Turks were taken completely by surprise and defeated. Sources report the massacre of 15,000 or, exaggerating, 30,000 soldiers of the Ottoman army. 15,000 prisoners, 24 horsetails of Ottoman commanders and the camp with all its precious contents fell into the hands of the Albanians.

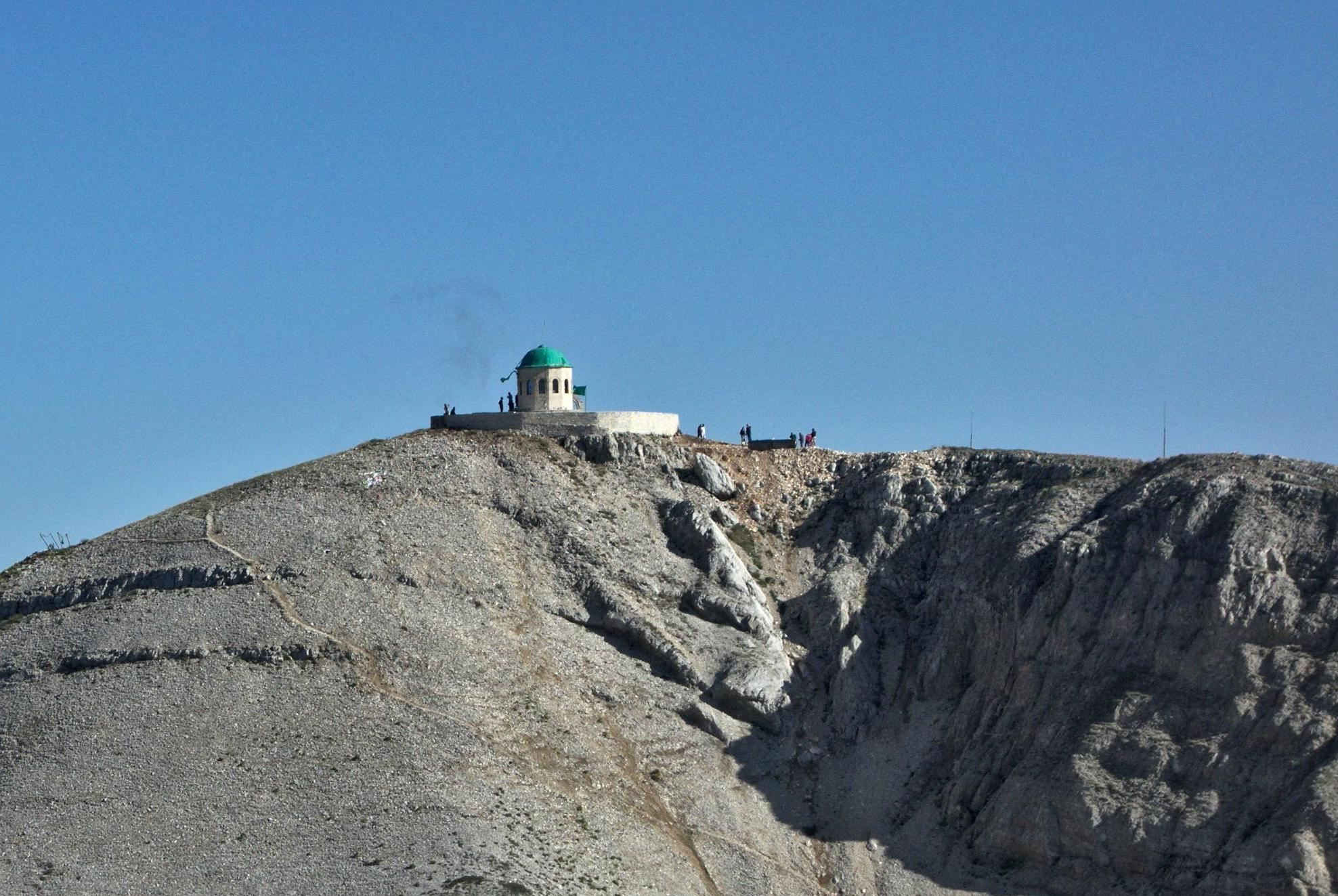
Shrine (tyrbe) of Abbas ibn Ali at the top of the southern peak of Tomorr

The particularities, beauty and sacredness of Mount Tomorr have been documented since the 17th century. Holy haunts were associated with certain orders of Islamic mysticism helping their expansion into the region. In the early 1880s, when the Bektashi Order was still growing, the movement took on a decisive Albanian nationalist character. The edifice at the top of the southern peak of Tomorr—a small round twelve-sided shrine encircled by a stone wall—is said to have been built or rebuilt during these years. Bektashis associated the shrine with the second tomb (türbe/tyrbe) of the legendary figure of Abbas ibn Ali (Albanian: Abaz Ali). Unverified sources claim that his mausoleum existed on Mount Tomorr since the 17th century.

In 1908-1909 a two-room stone dervishia was built some 100 metres (330 ft) below the tyrbe, but according to the account of British journalist Joseph Swire who visited the place in 1930 it was burned by Greek armed groups in spring of 1914. A new tekke (Albanian: teqe/teqja) was founded and built in 1916 on the Kulmaku Mountain by Dervish Iljaz Vërzhezha, on the southeastern part of the Tomorr range, just below the old dervishia.

According to the Albanian Bektashis of the early 20th century the tekke was built on the site of an ancient pagan temple. Mount Tomorr certainly seems to have been the site of a pre-Christian cult and to have been worshiped by the locals, both Christians and Muslims, as a mountain with a supernatural force—swearing solemn oaths "By Him of Tomorr" and "By the Holy One of Tomorr", and practicing ritual sacrifices of animals—long before the shrine of Abbas Ali was correlated with the sacred site. There is also the oral tradition about the existence of the Church of Saint Marie there; however, the site lacks concrete evidence of any ancient pre-Muslim shrine.

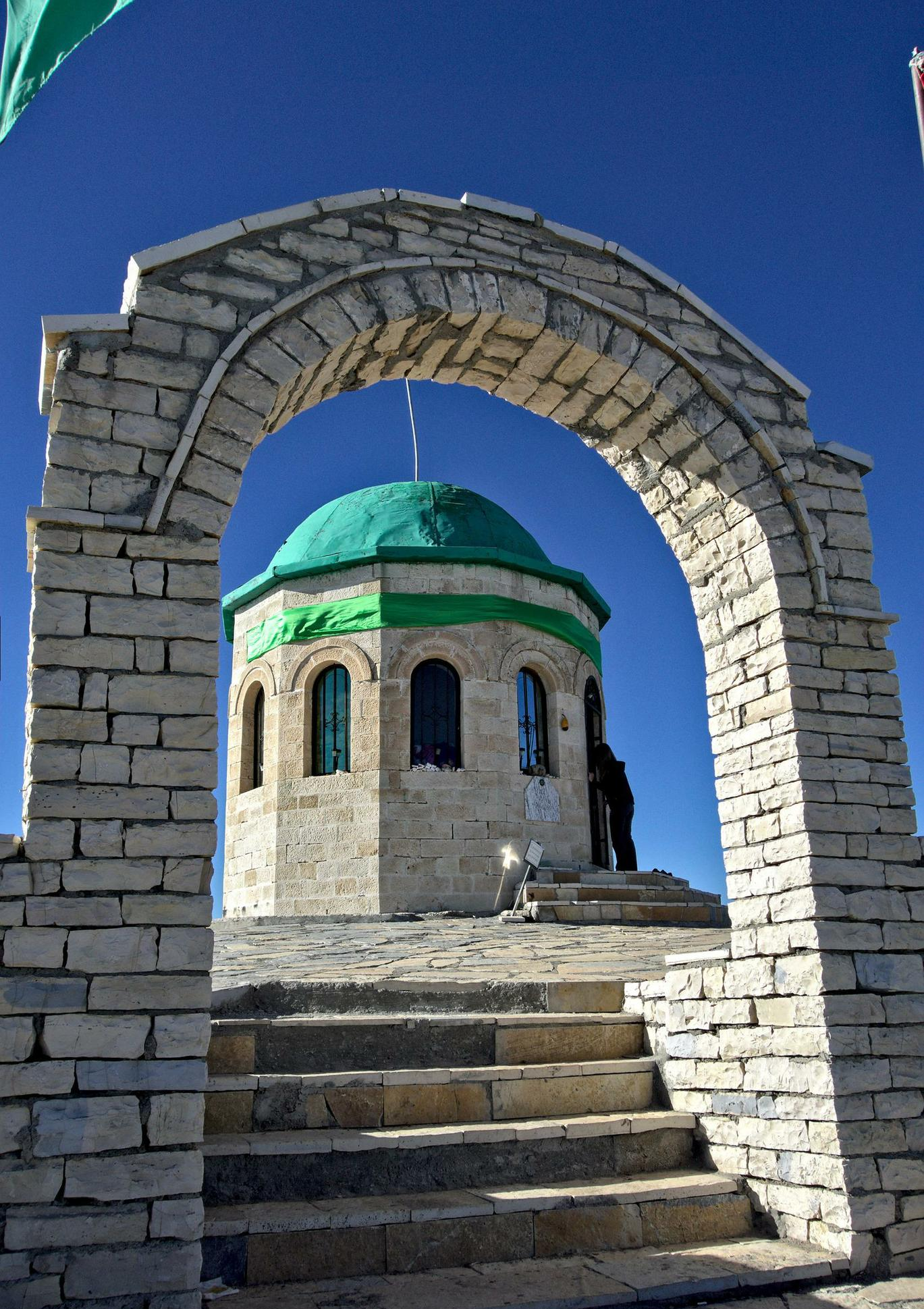
Tyrbe on top of the southern peak of Tomorr. The Abbas Ali shrine is included in the List of Cultural Monuments of Albania.

The first head of the tekke seems to have been Baba Haxhi. In the period between 1921 and 1925 the tekke was headed by Baba Ali Tomorri. Around 1930 about five dervishes were living in the structure.

During the Greco-Italian War (1940–1941) the Greek forces managed to advance towards the Italian positions in the region and at early April 1941 the Tomorri sector was controlled by units of the West Macedonia Army Department of the Greek Army.

Informations about the tekke during the communist period are scanty. After the communist dictatorship abolished religion in 1967, the pilgrimages stopped until the end of the regime. Under the pretext that the armed forces needed the mountain peak as a strategic military place, both the tyrbe and tekke were destroyed in 1967. After the fall of communism, the tekke was reconstructed in 1992, and the tyrbe in 2008. The tekke is presently headed by Baba Shaban. The number of participants in pilgrimages continues to grow every year.

== Cult and pilgrimage ==
Mount Tomorr is a sacred site to both Christians, who climb it on Assumption Day (August 15) to honor the Virgin Mary, and the Bektashi Order, who honor Abbas ibn Ali during an annual pilgrimage on August 20–25.

According to the traditions of the Bektashi Order, a Sufi community based primarily in Albania, Abbas ibn Ali (Albanian: Abaz Aliu) went to Albania on a white horse to save it from the barbarians, and continues to return to Mount Tomorr in Albania for five days (August 20-25) each year, during which animal sacrifices are made and homage is paid to Abbas ibn Ali. During these five days, Bektashi pilgrims visit the Abbas Ali Türbe, which is believed to house the remains of Abbas ibn Ali. The türbe is located on the southern peak of Mount Tomorr, which was originally constructed in 1620. The mausoleum lies adjacent to the Bektashi tekke on Mount Tomorr, which was built in 1916.

In another Bektashi legend, Haji Bektash once saw Christian pilgrims ascend Mount Tomorr on August 15, the feast day of the Assumption of the Virgin Mary. He responded by making a journey to the grave of Abbas ibn Ali in the holy city of Karbala, where he dug up an arm bone belonging to Abbas ibn Ali. Haji Bektash then threw the arm bone up onto the peak of Mount Tomorr, thus turning the mountain into the second sacred grave (türbe) of Abbas ibn Ali.

The cult of Mount Tomorr can be found in the Rilindja period of Albanian literature where authors such as Konstantin Kristoforidhi, Naim bey Frashëri, Andon Zako Çajupi, Asdreni, Hilë Mosi, and Ndre Mjeda devoted their works of prose and poetry to Father Tomor. As an example, Naim Frashëri wrote the following poem in his 1890 poetry book Luletë e verësë ("Summer Flowers"):

Abas Aliu zu’ Tomorë,
Erdhi afër nesh,
Shqipëria s’mbet e gjorë,
Se Zoti e desh.

Abbas Ali took over Tomorr,
He came to live with us,
Albania was no longer afflicted
For God came to love it.

== Legend ==
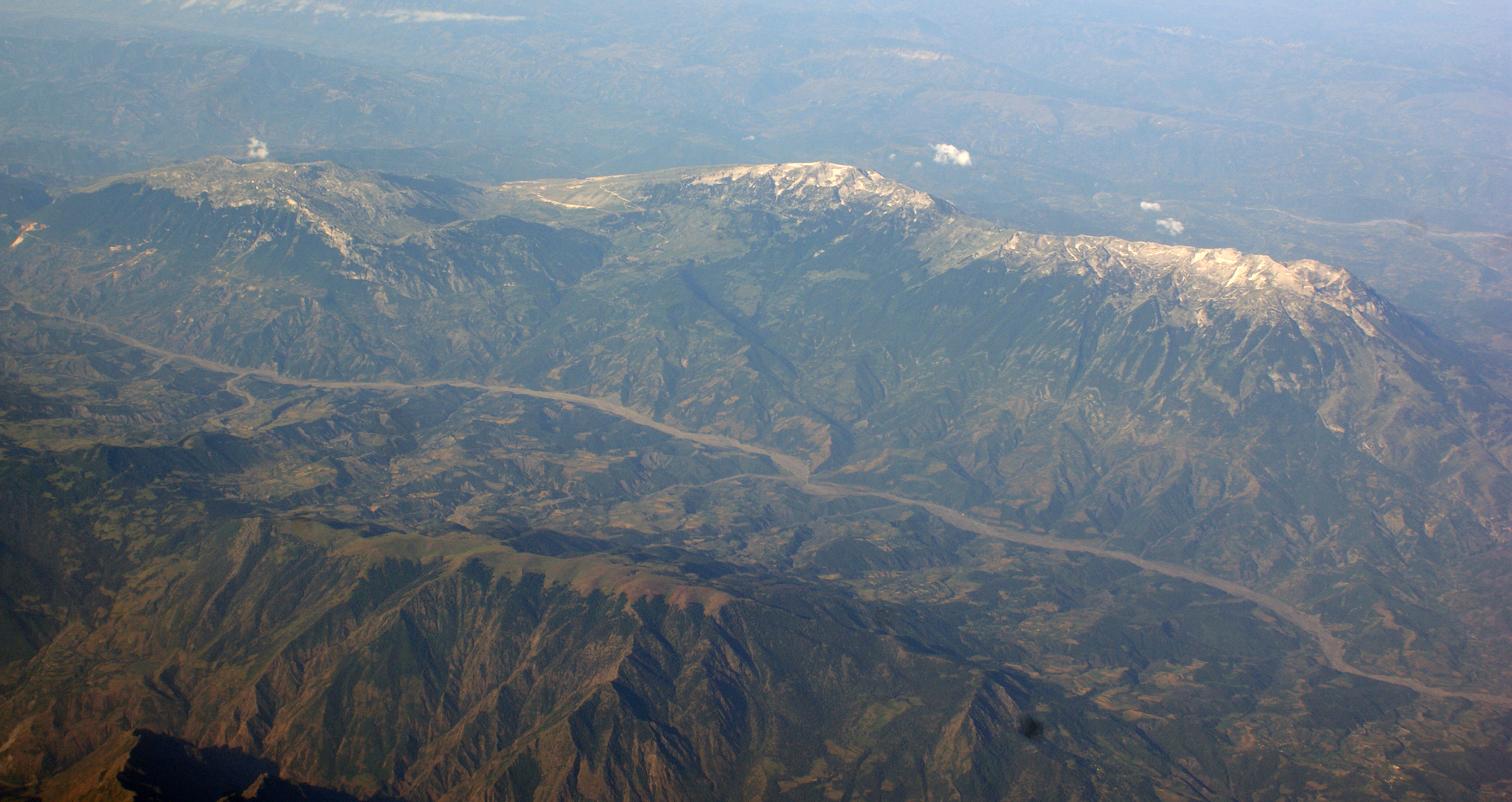
Tomorr from the air. Eastern side with Tomorrica river in front.

In Albanian folklore, Mount Tomorr is considered the home of the deities. Moreover, it is anthropomorphized and considered a deity itself, envisioned in the legendary figure of Baba Tomor, an old giant with a long flowing white beard and four female eagles hovering above him and perching on his snow-covered slopes. According to German folklorist Maximilian Lambertz, Baba Tomor is the remnant of an Illyrian deity.

Baba Tomor has taken the Earthly Beauty to be his bride. She spends her days with her sister, the Sea Beauty, E Bukura e Detit, but when evening comes, the wind, faithful servant of Baba Tomor, carries her back up the mountainside to him. Mount Tomor overlooks the town of Berat, which the old man jealously guards as his favourite city. Across the valley is Mount Shpirag with furrow-like torrents of water running down its slopes. While Baba Tomor was dallying in bed with the Earthy Beauty one day, Shpirag took advantage of the moment and advanced to take over Berat. The four guardian eagles duly awakened Baba Tomor from his dreams. When told of Shpirag's surreptitious plans, Baba Tomor arose from his bed. His first concern was for the safety of the Earthly Beauty and so he ordered the East Wind to carry her back to the home of her sister. Mounting his mule, Tomor then set off to do battle with Shpirag. With his scythe, Tomor lashed into Shpirag, inflicting upon him many a wound which can be seen today as the furrows running down the mountainside. A trace of the hoof of Baba Tomor's mule can, it is said, be seen near the village of Sinja BR. Shpirag, for his part, pounded Tomor with his cudgel and left many a wound on the lofty mountain, but was overcome. The two giants ultimately slew one another and the maiden drowned in her tears, which became the Osum river."

— Legend of Baba Tomor

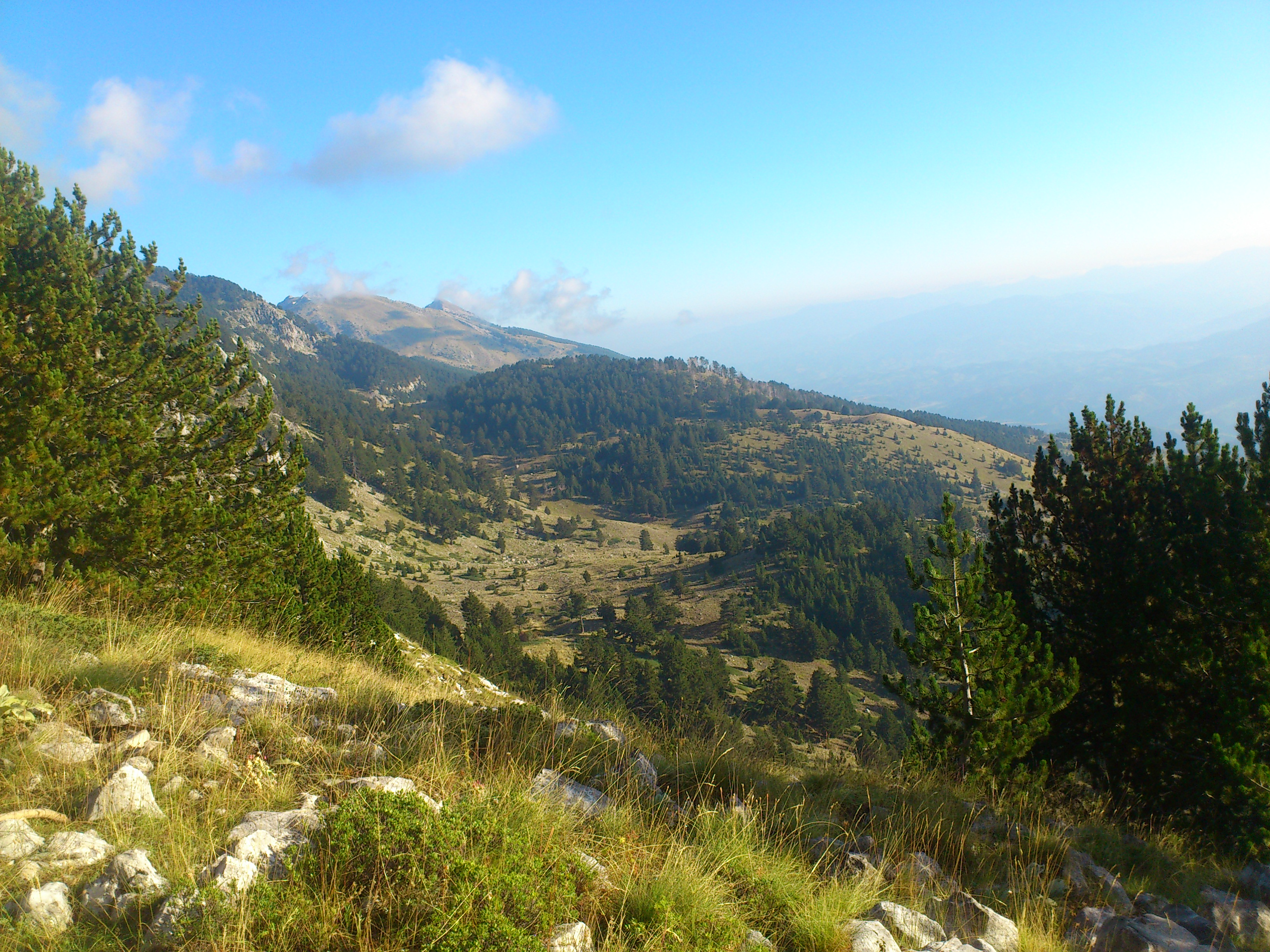
Forests of Tomorr

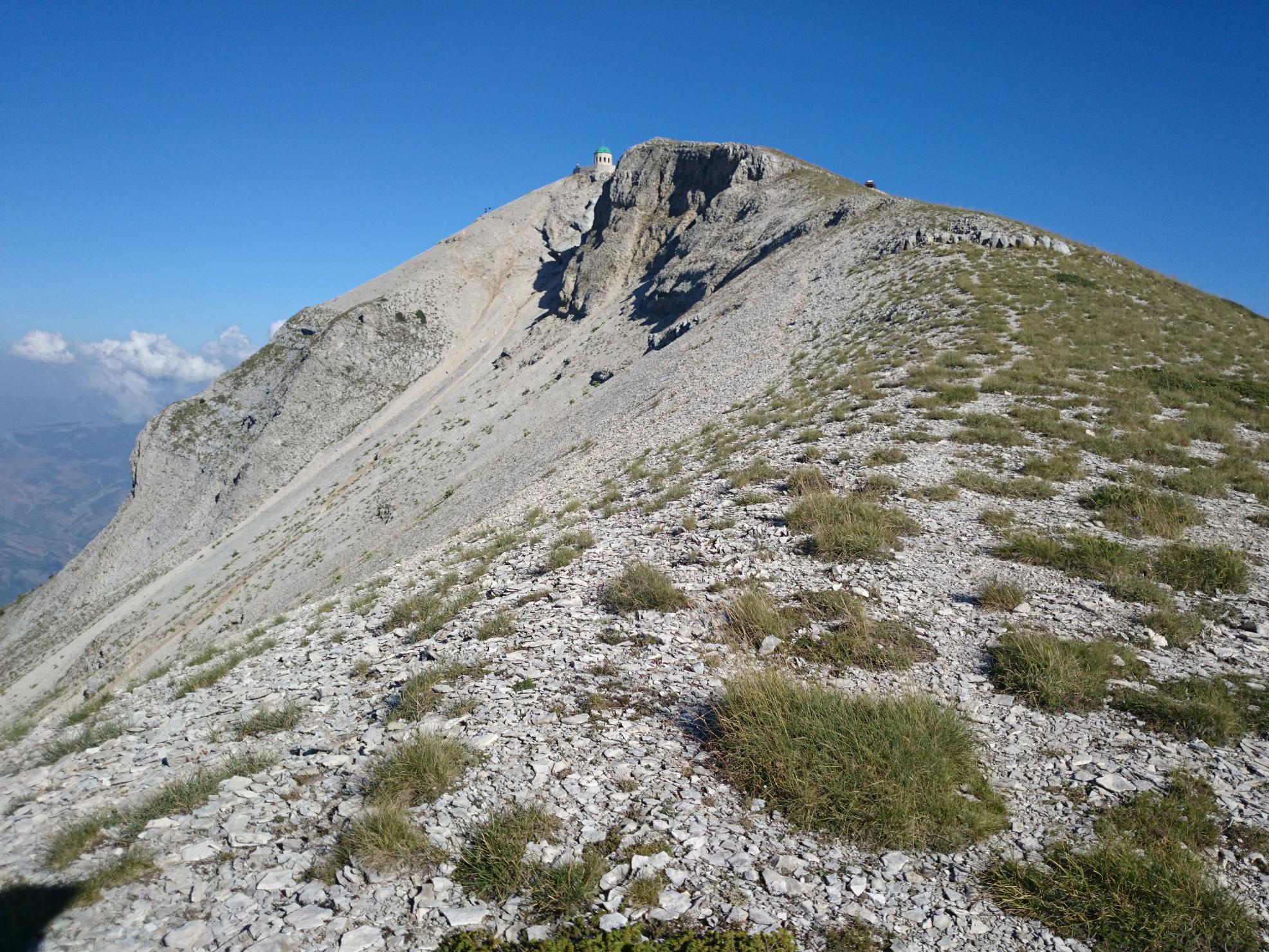
Bektashi tekke on the peak

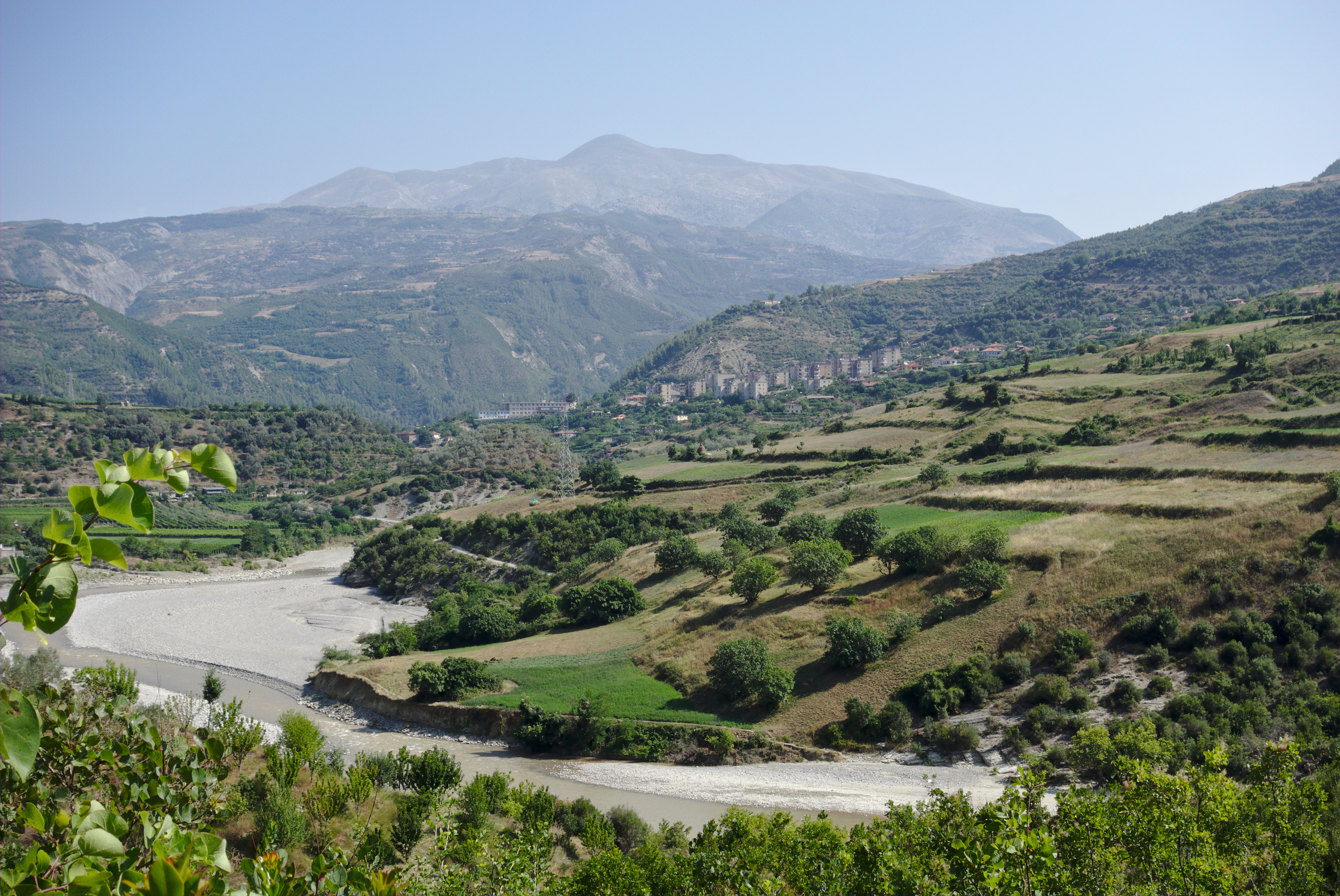
Osum river and Tomorr in the background

== See also ==
- Tomorr National Park
- Geography of Albania
- Mountains of Albania

== Sources ==
=== Bibliography ===
- Babinger, Franz (1992), Mehmed the Conqueror and His Time, Princeton University Press, ISBN 978-0-691-01078-6
- Bollobani, Elvira; Uruçi, Rudina (2019). "Geotourism potentials of the National Park "Mali i Tomorrit"". International Journal of Geoheritage and Parks. 7 (1). Elsevier B.V. on behalf of Beijing Normal University: 15–23. doi:10.1016/j.ijgeop.2019.03.001.
- Bulo, Jorgo (1997). "Mali i shenjtë i Tomorrit. Nga kulti pagan te miti romantik". Perla, revistë shkencore-kulturore tremujore (4). Tiranë: 3–7.
- Clayer, Nathalie (2017). "The pilgrimage to Mount Tomor in Albania: A changing sacred place in a changing society". In Tsypylma, Darieva; Kahl, Thede; Tonchev, Svetoslava (eds.). Sakralität und Mobilität im Kaukasus und in Südosteuropa. Austrian Academy of Sciences Press. pp. 125–142. ISBN 978-3-7001-8099-9.
- Elsie, Robert (2000). "The Christian Saints of Albania". Balkanistica. 13 (36): 35–57.
- Elsie, Robert (2001). A Dictionary of Albanian Religion, Mythology, and Folk Culture. New York, NY: New York University Press. ISBN 978-0-8147-2214-5.
- Elsie, Robert (2019). The Albanian Bektashi: History and Culture of a Dervish Order in the Balkans. Bloomsbury Publishing. ISBN 9781788315715.
- Fine, John V. A. (1994). The Late Medieval Balkans: A Critical Survey from the Late Twelfth Century to the Ottoman Conquest. University of Michigan Press. ISBN 0-472-08260-4.
- Hammond, Nicholas Geoffrey Lemprière; Griffith, Guy Thompson (1972). A History of Macedonia: Historical Geography and Prehistory. Vol. I. Oxford, UK: Clarendon Press. ISBN 9780198142942.
- Hammond, N.G.L. (1994). "9d. Illyrians and North-West Greeks". In Lewis, David Malcolm; Boardman, John (eds.). The Cambridge Ancient History, Volume 6: The Fourth Century BC. Cambridge, UK: Cambridge University Press. pp. 422–443. ISBN 0-521-23348-8.
- Hupchick, Dennis (2017). The Bulgarian-Byzantine Wars for Early Medieval Balkan Hegemony: Silver-Lined Skulls and Blinded Armies. Springer. ISBN 978-3319562063.
- Hasluck, Margaret (2015). The Unwritten Law in Albania. Cambridge University Press. ISBN 9781107586932.
- Kaljanac, Adnan (2010). Juzbašić, Dževad; Katičić, Radoslav; Kurtović, Esad; Govedarica, Blagoje (eds.). "Legenda o Kadmu i problem porijekla Enhelejaca" (PDF). Godišnjak/Jahrbuch. 39. Sarajevo: Akademija Nauka i Umjetnosti Bosne i Hercegovine: 53–79. ISSN 2232-7770.
- Krasniqi, Shensi (2014). "Pilgrimages in mountains in Kosovo". Revista Santuários, Cultura, Arte, Romarias, Peregrinações, Paisagens e Pessoas. ISSN 2183-3184.
- Mallory, J.P.; Adams, D.Q. (1997). Encyclopedia of Indo-European Culture. Taylor & Francis. ISBN 9781884964985.
- Nicol, Donald MacGillivray (2010), The Despotate of Epiros 1267–1479: A Contribution to the History of Greece in the Middle Ages, Cambridge University Press, ISBN 978-0-521-13089-9
- Osswald, Brendan (2007). "The Ethnic Composition of Medieval Epirus". In Ellis, Steven G.; Klusáková, Lud'a (eds.). Imagining Frontiers, Contesting Identities. Pisa: Edizioni Plus – Pisa University Press. pp. 125–154. ISBN 978-88-8492-466-7.
- Tirta, Mark (2004). Petrit Bezhani (ed.). Mitologjia ndër shqiptarë (in Albanian). Tirana: Mësonjëtorja. ISBN 99927-938-9-9.
- Toynbee, Arnold Joseph (1969). Some problems of Greek history. Oxford University Press. ISBN 978-0-19-215249-7.
- Winnifrith, Tom (2002). Badlands, Borderlands: A History of Northern Epirus/Southern Albania. Duckworth. ISBN 978-0-7156-3201-7.
