= Sayyida Ruqayya =

Sayyida Ruqayya may also refer to:

== People ==
- Ruqayyah bint Muhammad, daughter of Muhammad
- Sayyida Ruqayya bint Ali, daughter of Ali ibn Abi Talib
- Ruqayyah bint Husayn, daughter of Husayn ibn Ali

== Other uses ==
- Sayyidah Ruqayya Mosque, in Damascus, containing the grave of Rukayyah bint Husayn
- Mashhad of Sayyida Ruqayya, in Cairo, a memorial to Sayyida Ruqayya bint Ali

== See also ==
- Ruqayya
