= Bibi Pak Daman =

Shrine in Lahore, Pakistan

- بیبی پاک دامن
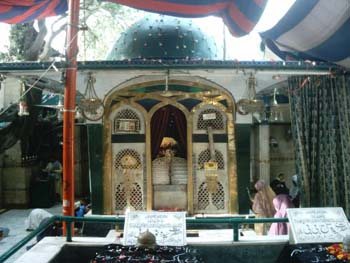
- The shrine complex in Lahore
- Interactive map of Bibi Pak Daman
- Location: Empress Road, Lahore, Punjab, Pakistan
- Coordinates: 31°34′9″N 74°20′30″E
- Type: Shrine & mausoleum
- Beginning date: 11th century (traditional)
- Dedicated to: Ruqayya bint Ali and five female companions

Bibi Pak Daman (Urdu: بیبی پاک دامن, romanized: Bībī Pāk Dāman) is a shrine dedicated to Ruqayya bint Ali in Lahore, Punjab, Pakistan. It is a major pilgrimage site for Shia Muslims. According to Imam Ali Raza Haram Research Centre Iran, the shrine contain the tomb of Ruqayya bint Ali, a daughter of Ali ibn Abi Talib, sister of Abbas ibn Ali and wife of Muslim ibn Aqil. Apart from her, the mausoleum contains the graves of five other ladies, which are said to be Muslim ibn Aqil's sister and daughters. It traditionally claimed that they came to Lahore after the Battle of Karbala in 680.

Bibi Pak Daman, which means the "chaste lady", is the collective name of the six ladies believed to be interred at this mausoleum, though it is also (mistakenly) popularly used to refer to the personage of Ruqayyah bint Ali alone. They were supposedly among the women who brought Islam to South Asia, preaching and engaging in missionary activity in the environs of Lahore.

Bibi Pak Daman is located between Garhi Shahu and Railway Station area. The easiest way to go to Bibi Pak Daman is from the Empress Road and from there, take the small road opposite Police Lines and then the first left-turn. Recently Government of Pakistan is considering approval of the expansion of the Bibi Pak Daman's shrine. The shrine a holy site in Shia Islam.

== Life ==
After the events at Karbala five Muslim women, led by Ruqayyah bint Ali left Mecca to settle and proselytize in Lahore, as a result of which a sizable portion of the Hindu community entered Islam.

According to one school of thought among historians such as S.M. Latif, Molvi Noor Ahmad Chishti and Mufti Ghulam Server the daughters of Ali were instructed by their father to go to Sindh and Hind to preach the Islamic faith. It was prophesied that their mission would achieve success. The events of the massacre at Karbala caused many relatives of Muhammad including Ruqayyah to migrate to Makran where she preached Islam for several years. The Hindu Raja of Jaisalmer felt threatened by her missionary work. Umayyad rulers were also displeased and a number of Umayyad spies were dispatched to assassinate her. Among such potential assassins had been Muhammad Bin Qasim who later switched allegiances and became a supporter of Ruqayyah after learning of the sufferings experienced by the family of Muhammad.

However, continued threats to Ruqayyah's life caused her to cross the Indus River to settle in Lahore. The local Hindu ruler there attempted to arrest her but this failed when his son, the Prince Bakrama Sahi, accepted Islam and became impressed with Ruqayyah's work. This enabled Ruqayyah to continue her missionary activities in peace for some more time. Eventually, fearing disgrace at the hands of the Hindu Raja's army when they were again dispatched to arrest her and the other five ladies, she gathered her female kin and made a collective prayer for rescue. As a fulfillment of their wishes, the ground split and their camp went underground. A shawl remained to mark the spot of that event.

Another school of thought among historians, including Kanhya Lal, Muhammad Aslam and Tanveer Anjum, argues that there was no reason for these Muslim women to settle in the Hindu-ruled Lahore.

== Names in history ==
Seven ladies and four men are traceable from history, as it is found that she introduced herself stating that “ I am widow of Martyr Muslim bin Aqeel, daughter of Ali and sister of commander-in-chief Abbas of Imam Hussain's Army and other five ladies were my sisters in law, whereas the sixth one was our maid “Halima” but she was equal to us in status. She introduced further telling the names of men that they were our guards and belonged to our tribes namely (i) Abb-ul-Fatah (ii) Abb-ul-Fazal (iii) Abb-ul-Mukaram, and (iv) Abdullah.

== Urs Sharif/Death Anniversary ==
In the Islamic month of Jumada al-Thani three days urs of Bibi Pak Daman from 7 to 9 is celebrated. The Tourism Development Corporation of Punjab Limited (TDCP), Government of Punjab has placed the shrine on the list of tourist attractions.

== Gallery ==
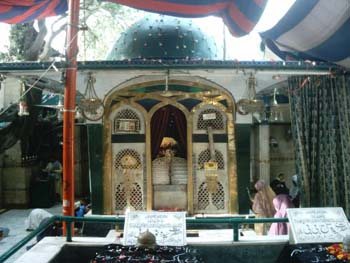
The main shrine

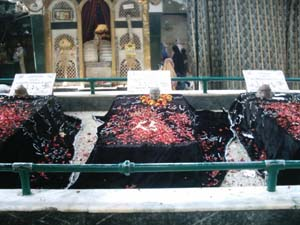
The graves

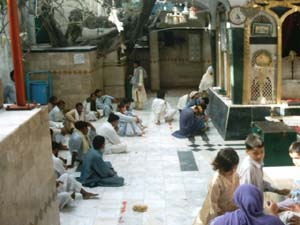
Attendees at Bi Bi Pak Daman

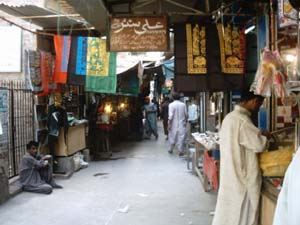
The street leading up to Bi Bi Pak Daman

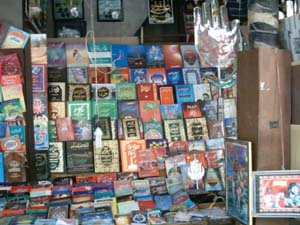
Religious book shop outside Bi Bi Pak Daman

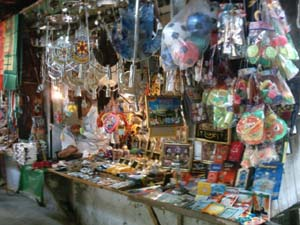
Shop outside Bi Bi Pak Daman

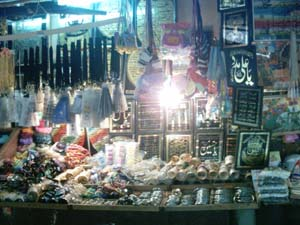
Brightly lit shop outside Bi Bi Pak Daman

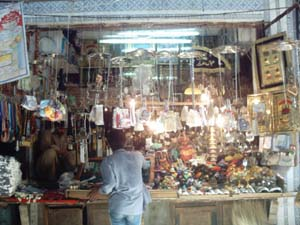
Another brightly lit shop outside Bi Bi Pak Daman

== See also ==
- List of mausolea
- Shahr Banu (for similarity to shrine at Lahore and Ray)
