= Shawdhab =

Companion of Husayn ibn Ali

Shawdhab Mawla Shakir شَوذَب مَولیٰ شاکِر

Personal life
- Died: 10th of Muharram, 61 A.H. / 10 October, 680 AD
- Cause of death: Killed in the Battle of Karbala
- Resting place: Karbala, Iraq
- Known for: Being a companion of Husayn ibn Ali

Religious life
- Religion: Islam

Shawdhab Mawla Shakir (Arabic: شَوذَب مَولیٰ شاکِر) was among Husayn ibn Ali's companions who was martyred at the Battle of Karbala.

== Biography ==
Shawdhab mentioned as the servant of Shakir ibn Abd Allah al-Hamdani al-Shakiri in some resource and others mentioned him as the servant of Abis ibn Abi Shabib al-Shakiri.

He was a memorizer of hadiths and transmitted hadiths from Ali ibn Abi Talib.

== Companion of Husayn ibn Ali ==
He and Abis ibn Abi Shabib al-Shakiri delivered the letter of Muslim ibn Aqil from Kufa to Husayn in Mecca and accompanied him from Mecca to Karbala.

== On the Day of Ashura ==
Abis ibn Abi Shabib al-Shakiri came to Shawdhab, who was his relative, and said, “What is your heart’s desire”? He replied, “What do I desire? I desire to fight alongside you, while defending the grandson of the Prophet of Allah, until I am martyred.” Abis replied, "and nothing else was expected from you. If I had anyone dearer than you today, I would send him to the battlefield before I would go."

He was martyred in the afternoon of Ashura after Hanzala ibn As'ad al-Shibami.
