= Ruqayya =

Ruqayya (Arabic: رقيّة) is an Arabic female given name meaning "to rise”, or ”she who rises high”. Like most Arabic names, it has multiple transliterations: Ruqayyah, Ruqiya, Ruqaya, Ruqaiya, Rukayya, Rukaiya, Rukiya, Rakiya, Rakia, etc..

It is not to be confused with a separate Arabic term "Ruqia" from Arabic رقى (ruqia) meaning “to rise” or “ascend.” However, it is also suggested it could mean "incantation" coming from ruqya.

Ruqayya bint Muhammad was the third child and second daughter of the Islamic prophet Muhammad and wife of the third Rashidun caliph Uthman.

Other notable people with the name include:

- Ruqayya bint Ali, daughter of Ali (cousin of Muhammad)
- Ruqayya bint Husayn, daughter of Husayn (grandson of Muhammad)
- Empress Ruqaiya Sultan Begum, first wife and chief consort of the Mughal Emperor Akbar
- Ruqaya Al-Ghasra, a Bahraini athlete. She was one of the first women to represent Bahrain at the Olympic Games
- Ruqayyah Ahmed Rufa'i, Nigerian Minister of Education
- Ruqaiyyah Waris Maqsood, British Muslim author and winner of the Global Peace and Unity Lifetime Achievement Award for literature
- Ruqayyah Boyer, a Dutch-Guyanese model and Miss Guyana Universe
- Ruqaiya Hasan, a professor of linguistics

== See also ==
- Arabic name
- List of peoples
- List of adjectival forms of place names
- Most popular given names
