= Atika bint Muslim =

Daughter of Muslim ibn aqil

- عَاتِكَةُ بِنْتُ مُسْلِمِ
- Born: 673 CE; Medina
- Died: 10 Muharram 61 AH (10 October 680 CE); Karbala, Iraq
- Parents: Muslim ibn Aqil (father); Ruqayya bint Ali (mother)

Atika bint Muslim (Arabic: عَاتِكَةُ بِنْتُ مُسْلِمِ), c. 673–680), was the daughter of Muslim ibn Aqil, the son of Aqil ibn Abi Talib. Muslim ibn Aqil served as the envoy of Husayn ibn Ali to Kufa. Her mother was Ruqayyah bint Ali ibn Abi Talib, the daughter of Ali ibn Abi Talib.

== Battle of Karbala and death (680) ==
She was born in Medina in 673 AH and was killed during the events of the Battle of Karbala in 680 CE.

After the killing of Husayn ibn Ali in the Battle of Karbala, the Umayyad army under the command of Umar ibn Sa'd attacked the camp of Husayn's family, looting and plundering it. During the attack, horses trampled and crushed the body of Atika bint Muslim. She was seven years old. Alongside her were six other children, including Sa'd and Aqil, the sons of Abd al-Rahman ibn Aqil, who was her uncle; her cousin Muhammad ibn Abi Sa'id ibn Aqil; and two daughters of her maternal uncle Hasan ibn Ali.
