= Sa'id ibn Abd Allah al-Hanafi =

Companion of Husayn ibn Ali

Sa'id b. 'Abd Allah al-Hanafi سعید بن عبد الله الحنفی

Personal life
- Died: 10th of Muharram, 61 A.H. / 10 October, 680 AD
- Cause of death: Killed in the Battle of Karbala
- Resting place: Karbala, Iraq
- Known for: Being a companion of Husayn ibn Ali

Religious life
- Religion: Islam

Sa'id ibn 'Abd Allah al-Hanafi (Arabic: سعید بن عبد الله الحنفی) was a companion of Husayn ibn Ali who was martyred in the Battle of Karbala. As a prominent Shi'ite and a nobleman in Kufa, he played a significant role in calling Imam al-Husayn to Kufa. He delivered several important letters of the Kufans to Imam al-Husayn. The final letter he delivered was Muslim ibn Aqil's letter to the Imam. From that point he accompanied the Imam from Mecca to Karbala. Sa'id is also remembered for his speech on the night before Ashura in which he proved his love for the Ahl al-Bayt and support of Imam al-Husayn.

== Lineage ==
Sa'id (or Sa'd) ibn Abd Allah al-Hanafi was from the Banu Hanifa ibn Lajim tribe, a clan of Banu Bakr ibn Wa'il from the 'Adnan tribe. He was one of Kufa's famous nobleman that was well known for his courage and piety.

== Joining Husayn ibn Ali ==
=== Delivering Letter of Kufans ===
After the death of Mu'awiya ibn Abi Sufyan, the people of Kufa wrote several letters to Husayn ibn Ali and invited him to their city. The third letter was delivered by Sa'id ibn Abd Allah al-Hanafi and Hani ibn Hani al-Sabi'i. Sa'id was so well-reputed that he could convince Husayn to come to Kufa. That letter was written by Shabath ibn Rib'i, Hajjar ibn Abjar, Yazid ibn al-Harith al-Shaybani, Yazid ibn Ruwaym, 'Uzra ibn Qays, 'Amr ibn Hajjaj and Muhammad ibn 'Umayr.

The letter began as such:

In the Name of God, the Compassionate, the Merciful. To Husayn ibn Ali from the Shi'ite Muslims. Please come sooner because the people are waiting for you and their hearts are with you. Please hurry. Peace be upon you. Every place is green, fruits are ripe, and water wells are full. Please come; your army is ready, and peace be upon you.

Husayn wrote a reply to this letter and Sa'id delivered it to people of Kufa. He appointed Muslim ibn Aqil as his representative in Kufa. When Muslim entered Kufa, he stayed in al-Mukhtar al-Thaqafi's house and delivered a speech for people. Muslim ibn Aqil gave Sa'id the responsibility to call Imam Husayn to Kufa. Sa'id returned to Mecca and delivered Muslim ibn Aqil's letter to Husayn. He accompanied Husayn from Mecca to Karbala.

=== Night before Ashura ===
Husayn called all his companions to gather behind the camp and gave a speech, asking them to take the hands of their friends and escape the land in the darkness of the night. Husayn said, "these people are after me, so there is nothing for you to be concerned about, and I will forgive you all".

Sa'id stood up and replied to the Husayn:

O, the son of the Prophet! I swear to God that we will never stop helping you so that God knows that we have obeyed the Prophet's will about his progeny. I swear to God that if I am killed and then restored to life, and my corpse is burned 70 times and my ashes are scattered by the wind, I will never give up on you. May I be sacrificed for you.

=== In the Battle of Karbala ===
Sa'id went to Husayn after the noon prayer on the day of Ashura and asked for his permission to go to the battlefield. He went to the battlefield while chanting paeans and inflicted many casualties on the enemy's army before becoming martyred.

A different account states that Sa'id was martyred after the noon prayer while protecting Husayn. When Husayn was reciting the noon prayer, the enemy's army approached him. Sa'id guarding him by making himself a shield against the arrows thrown at Husayn and the other companions performing prayers. He was hit by arrows in his face, chest, sides, and hands. When he fell down and was dying, he made the following prayer: "O, God! As you have cursed the people of 'Ad and Thamud, curse these people [that is, the army of Kufa]. O, God! Send my regards to your prophet and inform him of pains and injuries I have suffered in my body, since I have helped your prophet to achieve your rewards."

It is said that Sa'id then turned to Husayn, and said to him: "O the son of the Prophet! Have I fulfilled my pledge?"

He responded: "Yes, you are in the heaven in front of me."

It is said that when he was martyred, there were 13 arrows on his body in addition to injuries by swords and spears.
