= Abis ibn Abi Shabib al-Shakiri =

Abis ibn Abi Shabib al-Shakiri عابس بن ابي شبيب الشاکري

Personal life
- Died: 10th of Muharram, 61 A.H. / 10 October, 680 AD
- Cause of death: Killed in the Battle of Karbala
- Resting place: Karbala, Iraq
- Known for: Being a companion of Husayn ibn Ali

Religious life
- Religion: Islam

Abis ibn Abi Shabib al-Shakiri (Arabic: عابس بن ابي شبيب الشاکري) was injured in the Battle of Siffin and martyr of Karbala.

== Lineage ==
Abis was from Banu Shakir clan of the great Banu Hamdan tribe. People of his tribe were brave ones at war and thus Arabs called them Fatayan al-Sabah, meaning "the Youths of the Morning". his father has been recorded as Shabib, Habib, Shibth or Layth. Abis was perfect in the good qualities of his tribe. He was one of the Shia noblemen and their chiefs. Abis was among the lovers of the Ahl al-Bayt and the followers of Ali ibn Abi Talib who loved him exceptionally.

== Supporting Ali ibn Abi Talib ==
Abis joined Ali ibn Abi talib in the Battle of Siffin and injured on his forehead in the Battle of Siffin, the mark of which remained on his forehead forever.

== Supporting Muslim ibn Aqil ==
After Muslim ibn Aqil entered Kufa, he went to the house of Mukhtar ibn Abi Ubayd. The Shia of Kufa gathered there. Muslim read the letter of Husayn to them, hearing which they started weeping. In this gathering, Abis was the first person who arose and after Praising and Glorifying Allah said, “Now then! I do not speak for the people, nor am I aware as to what is concealed in their hearts, and thus I do not want to deceive you. By Allah! I only say that which is in my heart. By Allah! I shall respond to you whenever you call out, and shall fight your enemies by your side. And in your presence I shall strike them with the sword until I meet Allah, and I do not intend anything except Allah’s favor (in lieu of all this).” Then, Habib ibn Muzahir stood up and announced his readiness for helping Husayn. The speeches these two persons prepared the ground for allegiance of people and more than 18 thousand people gave allegiance to Muslim.

== Supporting Husayn ibn Ali ==
After many of the people of Kufa gave allegiance to Muslim, he wrote a letter to Husayn and invited him to Kufa and sent this letter by Abis ibn Abi Shabib with his slave. He delivered it to Husayn in Mecca.

After delivering the letter, Abis accompanied Husayn ibn Ali and his caravan from Mecca to Karbala. Abis performed the noon prayer, When most of the companions of Husayn were martyred and a few were left, Abis turned to his servant Shawdhab and said, "what do you want to do?"

Shawdhab said, "Together with you, I will defend the son of the Prophet."

Abis said, "I did not expect from you other than this...If I had anyone dear than you, I would send him to the battlefield before myself, since today is the last chance to act and tomorrow is the day of reckoning and no act would be beneficial then."

After the martyrdom of his servant Shawdhab, Abis went to Husayn and said, "O Aba Abd Allah! By God I swear that on the earth, whether far or near, I have no one dearer than you. If I had the power to keep off the oppression from you by something even more valuable than my life and blood, I would definitely do so."

He then said, "May peace be upon you O Aba Abd Allah! I testify that I am upon your guidance and the guidance of your father! Greetings be upon you O Aba Abd Allah! Beware that I am steadfast upon the way of you and your father and I will be guided to the right path." After he received permission from Husayn, he went to the battlefield.

Rabi' ibn Tamim al-Hamdani, who was in the army of Umar ibn Sa'd, said, "when I saw Abis was coming to the battlefield, I recognized him. I had seen his fights in different battles and I knew that he was among the bravest people, so, I told the army of Umar ibn Sa'd, This man is the lion of all lions. This is son of Shabib. Lest anyone should ever go to fight him." Abis was shouting far cries and asking for someone to go fight him, but no one dared to go to the battlefield.

When 'Abis saw that no one was going to fight him, took off his armor and his helmet and attacked the army of Kufa and disarranged the army. By the order of 'Umar ibn Sa'd, they stoned him.

Rabi' ibn Tamim said, "By God I swear that I saw him injured and killed more than 200 people, but finally, they besieged him and beheaded him. I witnessed that the head of 'Abis ibn Shabib was being handed to each other by them and they argued to attribute his killing to themselves, until 'Umar ibn Sa'd said, "Do not argue with each other! By God I swear not one person could have killed this man.'"

The headless body of Abis was moved to the tent of martyred by Husayn and after the Event of Ashura, he was buried by Banu Asad tribe.

Abis was among those companions of Husayn, whose name has been mentioned in Ziyarat Rajabiyya and Ziyarat al-Nahiya al-Muqaddasa (non-famous). He has been greeted well in the two Ziyara as following, "Peace be upon 'Abis ibn Shabib al-Shakiri."
