= Muhammad ibn Muslim and Ibrahim ibn Muslim =

Sons of Muslim ibn Aqil

Muhammad ibn Muslim and Ibrahim ibn Muslim مُحَمَّد ٱبْن مُسْلِم وَ إِبْرَاهِيم ٱبْن مُسْلِم
- Burial place: Musayyib, Babil Governorate, Iraq
- Parents: Muslim ibn Aqil (Father); Ruqayya bint Ali (Mother)
- Relatives: Aqil ibn Abi Talib (Grandfather); Abu Talib ibn Abd al-Muttalib (Great-grandfather)

Muḥammad ibn Muslim (Arabic: مُحَمَّد ٱبْن مُسْلِم) and Ibrāhīm ibn Muslim (Arabic: إِبْرَاهِيم ٱبْن مُسْلِم) were the sons of Muslim ibn Aqil and the grandsons of Aqil ibn Abi Talib. Muslim ibn Aqil was the messenger of Husayn ibn Ali to the people of Kufa, while Aqil ibn Abi Talib was the brother of Ali and the cousin of Muhammad. These children are also included among the martyrs of the Battle of Karbala.

== Event in Kufa ==
After Muslim ibn Aqil was martyred, Muhammad and Ibrahim were also arrested and put into a dungeon. It is said that Muhammad was just eight years old and Ibrahim was just less than seven years old (according to Book Majalis al-Muntazirin, Volume#1, Page#261)

On the 12th of Dhu al-Hijjah in 60 Hijra, when the jailer came to give the children their evening meal, he saw them saying their prayers. The jailer waited. When the boys had finished their prayers, he asked them who they were. When the jailer learnt that they were the sons of Muslim ibn Aqil and the grandsons of Aqil ibn Abi Talib, he let them escape. The children came out of the prison.

It was a dark night. Their first thought was to go to Husayn ibn Ali and warn him not to go to Kufa. Everywhere they went, they found the roads blocked by Ubayd Allah ibn Ziyad's soldiers. They found it was impossible to get out of Kufa.

They found themselves by the side of the river Euphrates. They drank some water from the river and then went up a tree to hide for the day. Just then a woman came to the river to get water. She saw the two young boys and asked them who they were. Ibrahim said, "We are two orphans, could you please leave us alone and not tell any one that you have seen us?" The woman asked them to accompany her to her mistress who would help them. The woman's mistress was a kind lady. After talking to the boys for a while, she realized who they were. She gave them food and said to them, "You can spend the day here and I will try to help you. Unfortunately my husband Harith is working for Ubayd Allah ibn Ziyad. He is out at the moment. You can rest in the spare room but make no noise otherwise when he comes back, he will find out you are here".

The children said their prayers and went to sleep. In the evening, Muhammad woke up and started crying. Ibrahim asked him why he was crying. Muhammad said "I saw our father in a dream. He was calling out for us". Ibrahim said, "Brother, be patient. I also saw our father in a dream beckoning us to him". They both started weeping. Harith, who had come back, heard the children crying. He opened the door and asked the children who they were. On learning they were the sons of Muslim ibn Aqil, he tied both the boys to a pillar. Harith's wife tried to stop him, but he beat her up. Harith wanted to collect the reward which Ubayd Allah ibn Ziyad had offered to anyone capturing the children.

The children spent the whole night tied to the pillar. In the morning, Harith dragged them to the river-bank and took out his sword. Ibrahim asked him, "Harith, are you going to kill us?" Harith said, "Yes!" Ibrahim said, "In that case, give us time to finish our Fajr prayer." The two boys said their prayers. They raised their hands and cried out, "Inna Lillahi wa Inna Ilayhi Raji'un! O God, we are coming to you. Give our mother courage when she hears of our death and judge between us and our killers!" The sword came down and there were splashes in the water. Two young bodies were seen floating away in the waters of the river Euphrates.

== Burial ==
According to tradition, the two children of Muslim ibn Aqil were killed near the Euphrates River and are buried near the town of Musayyib in Babil Governorate, Iraq.

== See also ==
- List of casualties in Husayn's army at the Battle of Karbala
- Muhammad
- Ali
- Husayn ibn Ali
- Muslim ibn Aqil
- Awn ibn Abd Allah ibn Ja'far
- Muhammad ibn Abd Allah ibn Ja'far
- Battle of Karbala
- Ruqayya bint Ali
