= Sayyida Ruqayya Mosque =

Mosque and mausoleum in Damascus, Syria

- مَسْجِد ٱلسَّيِّدة رُقَيَّة
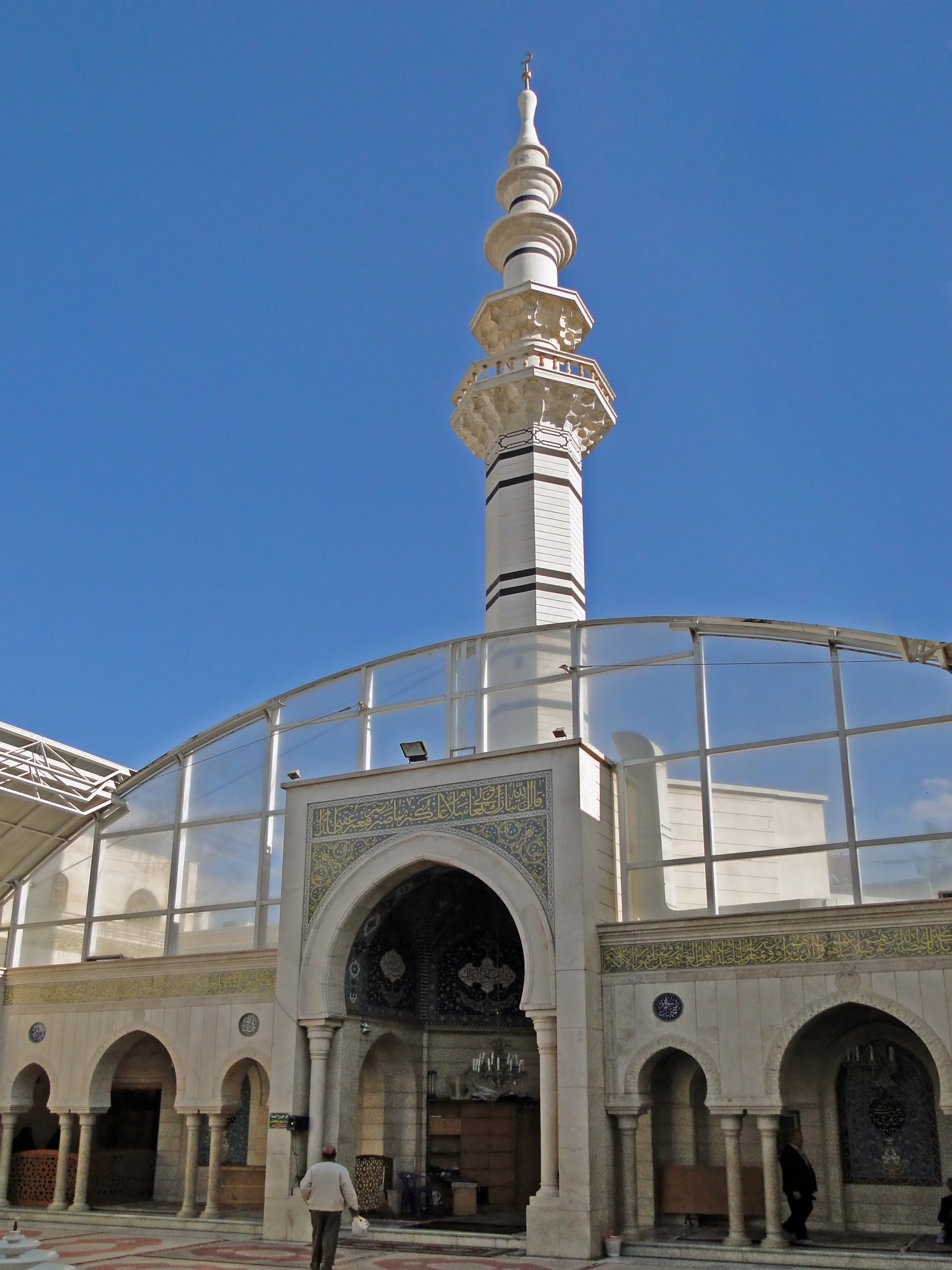
- The mausoleum of Ruqayya bint Husayn

- Location of the mosque and mausoleum in Syria

Religion
- Affiliation: Shia (Twelver)
- Ecclesiastical or organisational status: Mosque and mausoleum

Location
- Location: Damascus, Ash-Sham
- Country: Syria
- Interactive map of Sayyida Ruqayya Mosque
- Coordinates: 33°30′48″N 36°18′26″E

Architecture
- Type: Islamic architecture
- Style: Iranian
- Completed: unknown (mausoleum); 1985 (mosque)

Specifications
- Dome: One
- Minaret: One
- Shrine: One: (Sukainah)

The Sayyida Ruqayya Mosque (Arabic: مَسْجِد ٱلسَّيِّدة رُقَيَّة, romanized: Masjid as-Sayyida Ruqayya) is a Shia mosque and mausoleum complex, located in Damascus, Syria. The complex contains the grave of Ruqayya bint Husayn, the young daughter of Husayn. It is a holy site in Shia Islam.

== Description ==
The Sayyida Ruqayya Mosque is located in the Al-Amara district of Damascus. It honors Ruqayya bint Hussein, the young daughter of Imam Hussein. Recognized for its unique architectural design, its backgrounds with its intricate tilework, and its serene courtyard, the mosque draws guests from a variety of cultures. It is a sacred place for Shia Muslims, attracting tens of thousands who visit the mosque and shrine as a place of pilgrimage to revere Ruqayya. Her life and legacy—which were shaped by the events that followed the Battle of Karbala—have great significance, particularly on religious commemorations. The mosque is a place of prayer and recollection.

Shia Muslims hold the Sayyida Ruqayya Mosque in high regard because of its connection to the events of Karbala and the sacrifices made by the Prophet Muhammad and his family. It is a crucial religious and cultural shrine in the Islamic world because it represents the resiliency and faith of young girls.

According to Shi'ite Islamic narrations that are commemorated every year on the occasion of Ashura, after enduring the Battle of Karbala and the torturous journey to Damascus that followed it, Sukaynah died at the age of four in Yazid's prison, where her body was originally buried. Years later, however, upon the flooding of her gravesite, her grave was reopened and the body was moved to the site where the mosque now stands. The mosque was built around the mausoleum in 1985 and exhibits a modern version of Iranian architecture, with a substantial amount of mirror and gold work. There is a small mosque area adjoining the shrine room, along with a small courtyard in front. This mosque is found a short distance from the Umayyad Mosque and the Al-Hamidiyah Souq in central Damascus.

=== Burial site ===
The burial location of Sayyida Ruqayya in Damascus—where Ruqayya bint Hussein, daughter of Imam Hussein, is buried—has great spiritual significance. It stands for the Prophet Muhammad's family's legacy and the sacrifices they made both during and after the Battle of Karbala.

==== Development of the mosque ====
Over time, the mosque has gone through a lot of construction due to the ongoing war though it became one of the most known mosques in Syria. The mosque's architecture's elaborate tile work and traditional Islamic elements in its design are a reflection of the region's cultural heritage.

=== Death of Ruqayya ===
The demise of Ruqayya bint Hussein followed the tragic events of the Battle of Karbala in 680 CE. She had to go through a lot as a young child, seeing her family suffer. Her health and well-being were severely damaged by the battle's aftermath, including her captivity and her journey to Damascus.

Ruqayya's age at death was believed to be between three and four years old. Her early death in Damascus was caused in part by her young age and the unjust circumstances she faced.

Ruqayya's remaining relatives were greatly saddened by her death knowing they would have to leave her in Damascus. Shia Muslims use her story to emphasize the story of sacrifice and resiliency that is fundamental to their faith. It also serves as a symbol of the innocence lost and the pain faced by the Prophet Muhammad's family.

Every year, Sayyida Ruqayya is honored at the mosque with commemorations and pilgrimages, especially during Muharram and Safar, which attract Shia Muslims from all over the world to take part in ceremonies and pay their respects.

== Gallery ==
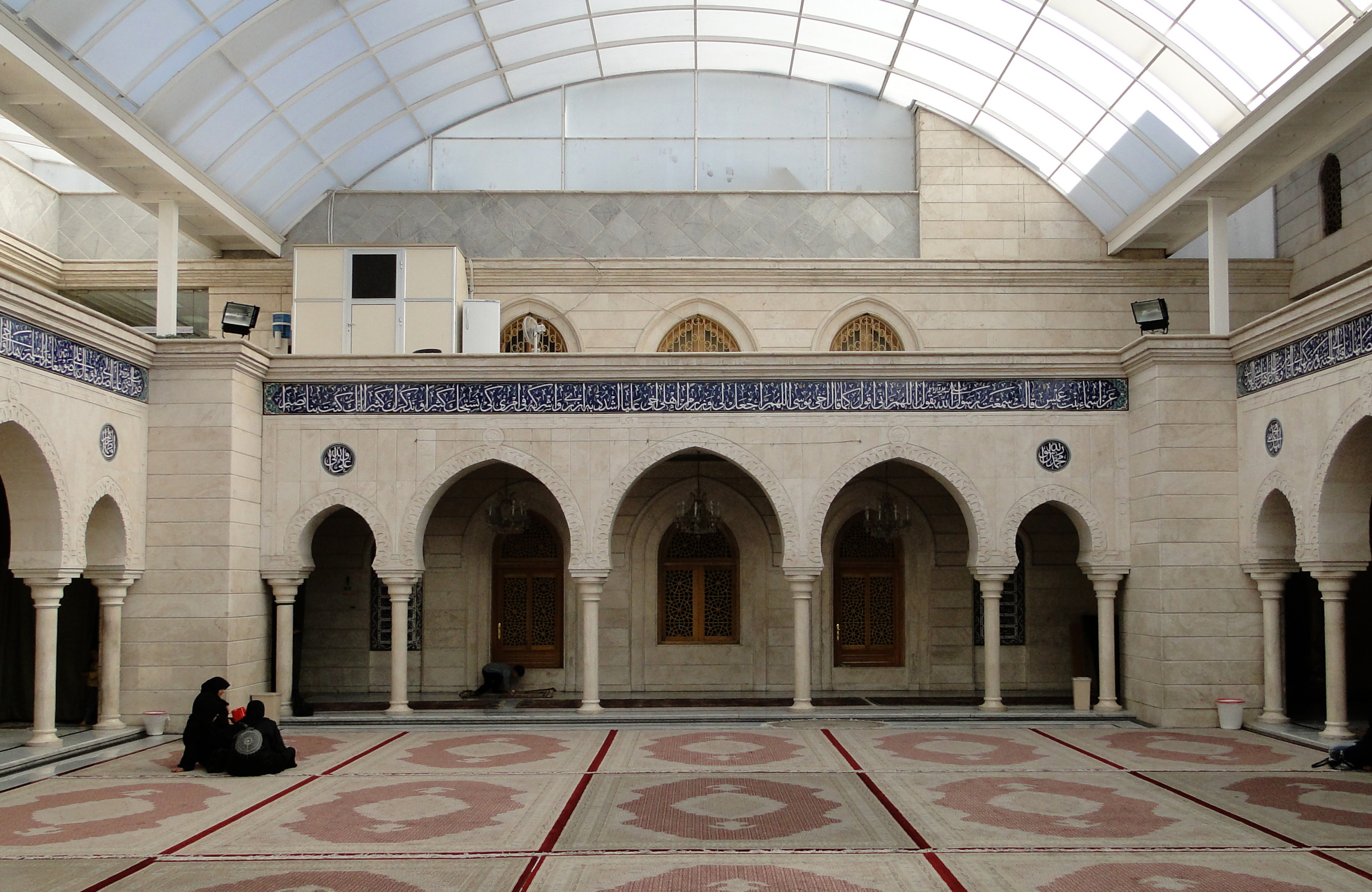
View of the sahn

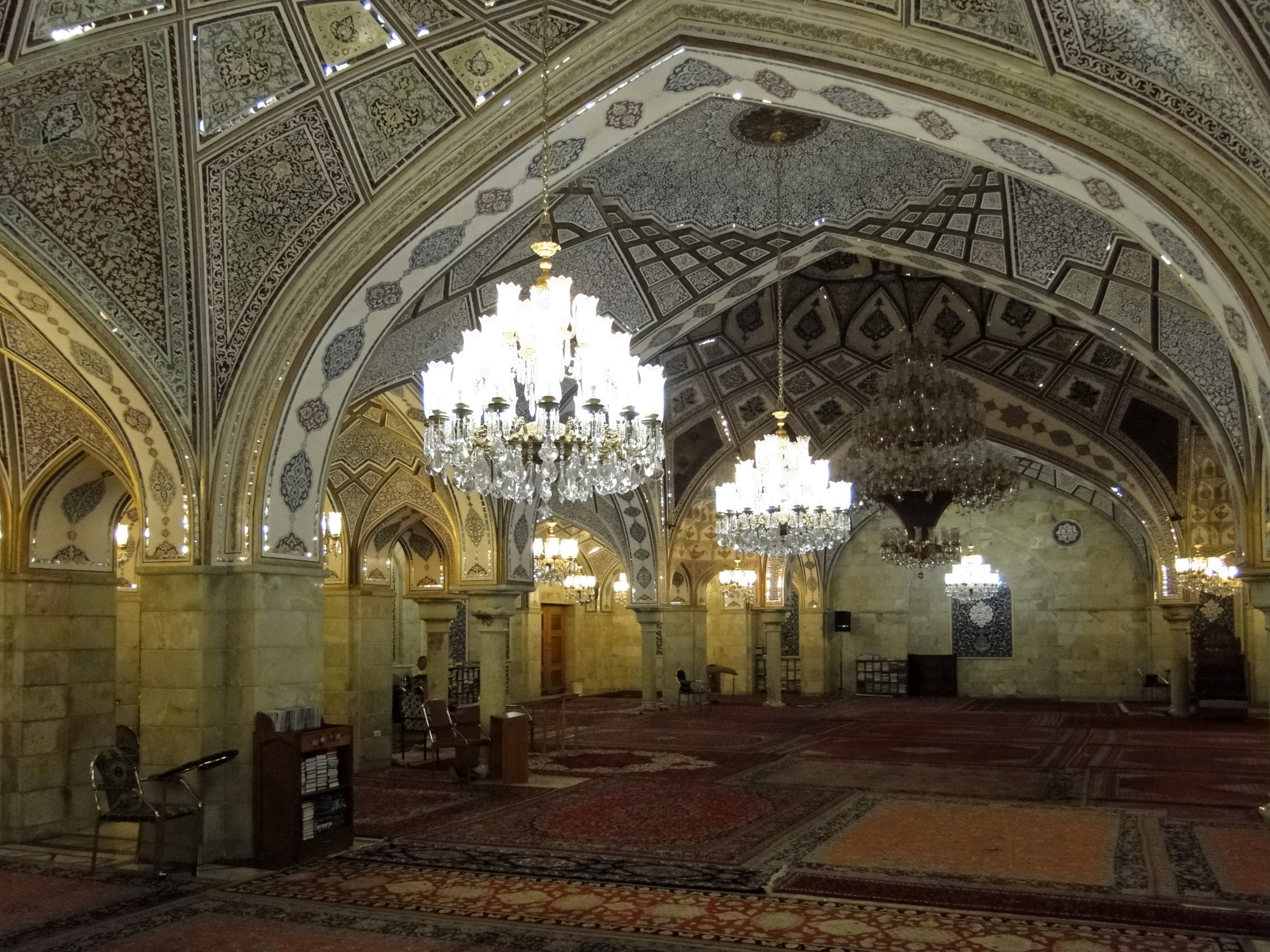
Prayer hall

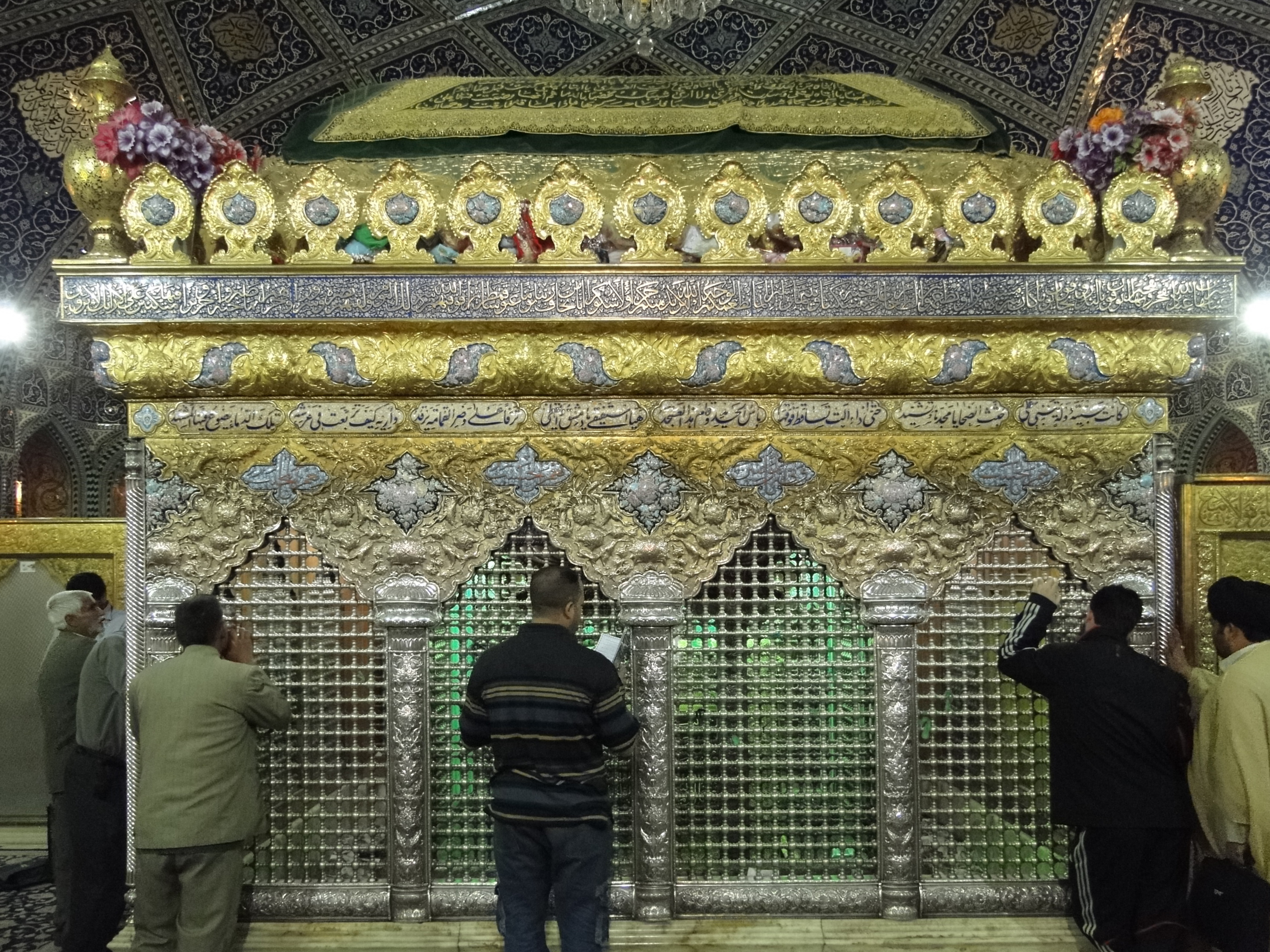
Grave of Sayyida Ruqayya

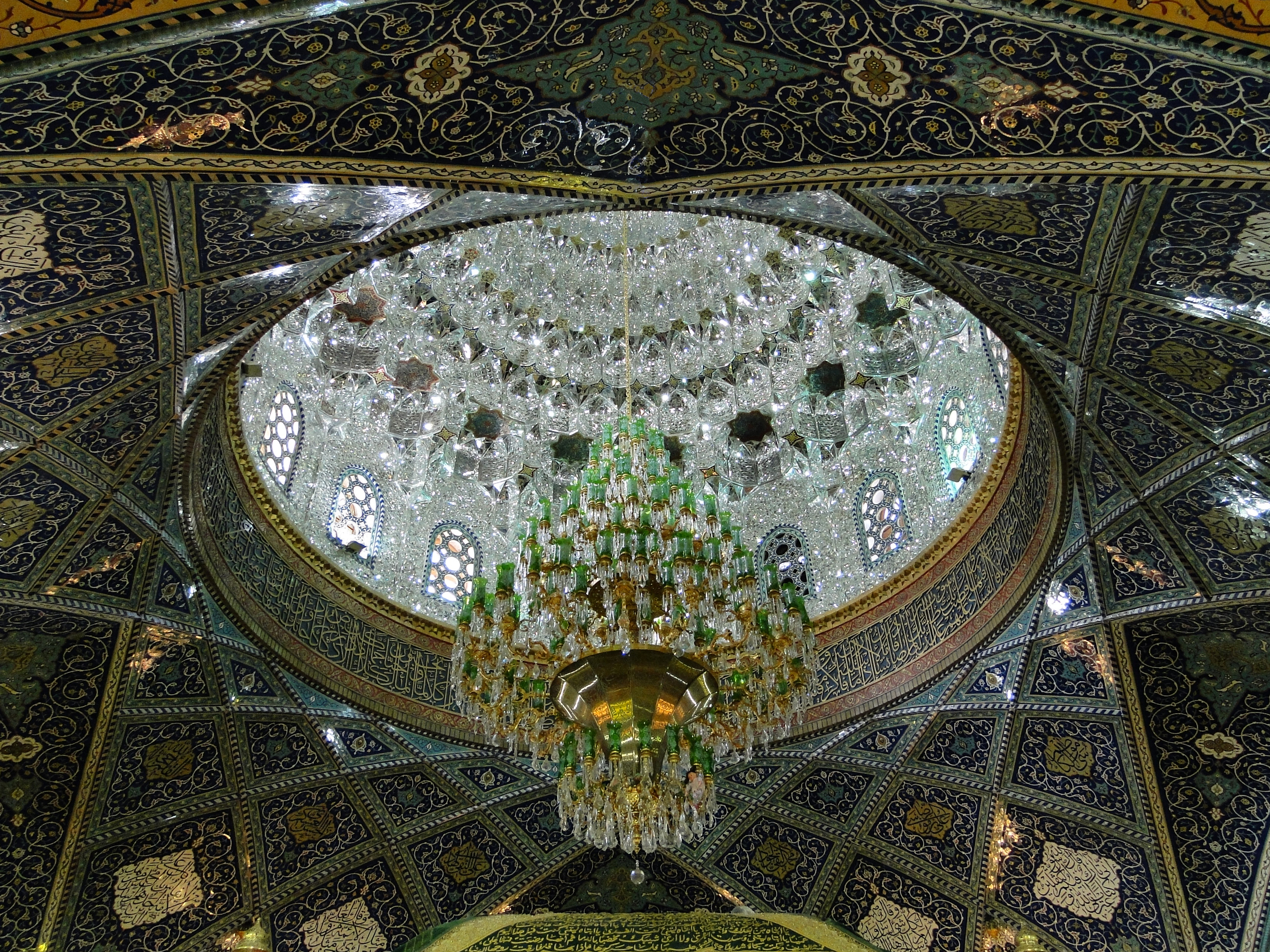
A chandelier in the mosque

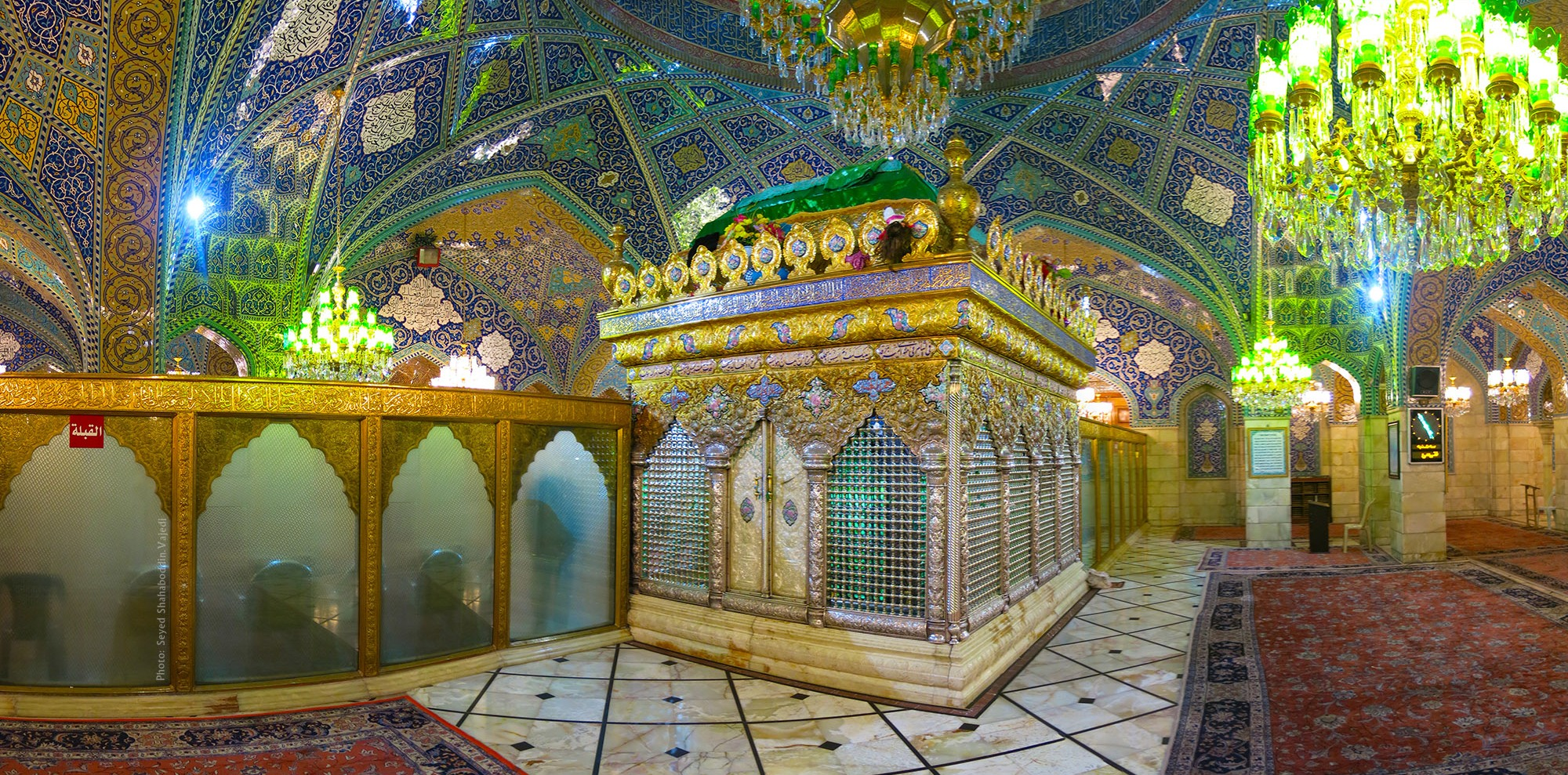
Zarih

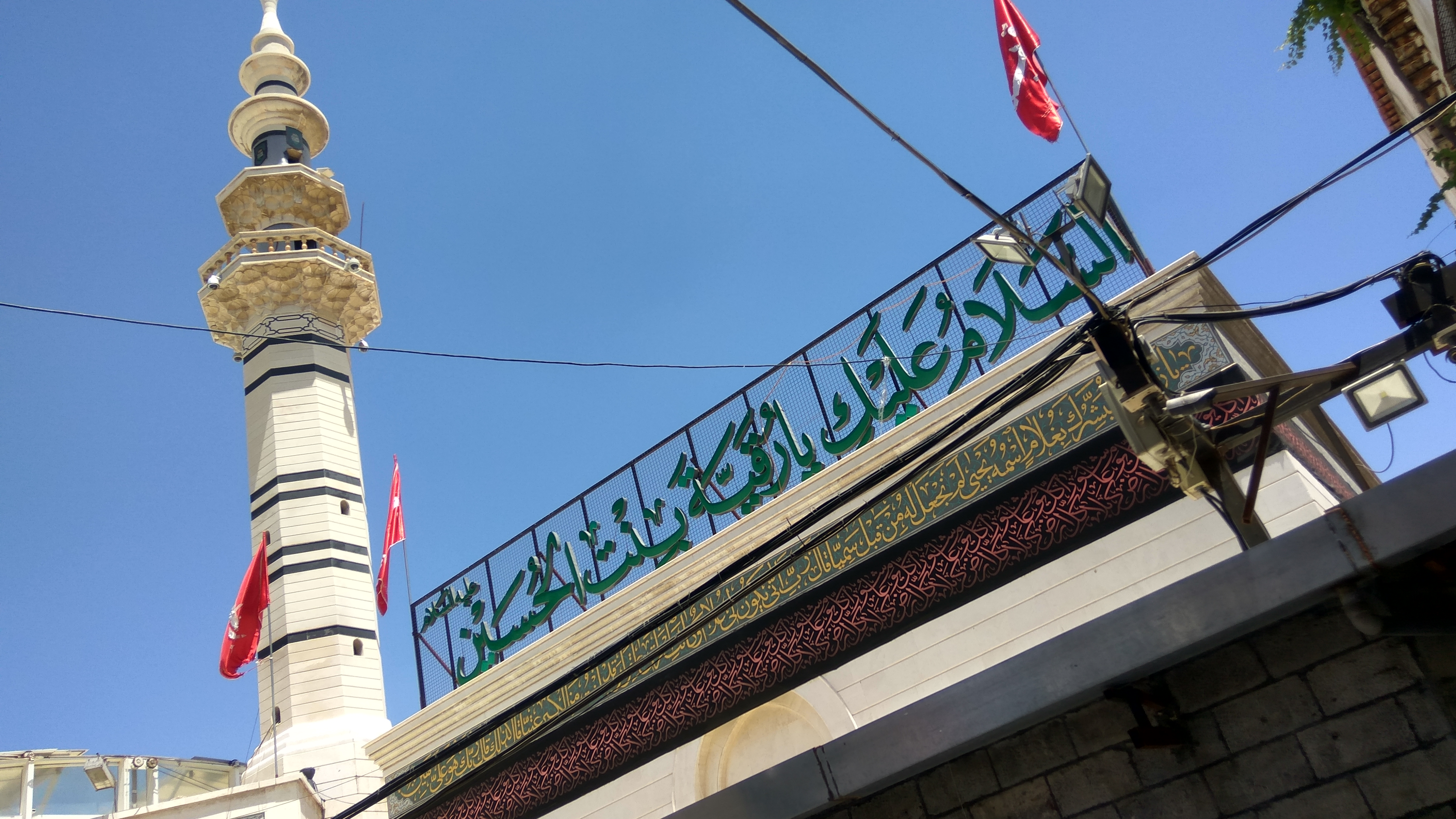
Name board on the mosque

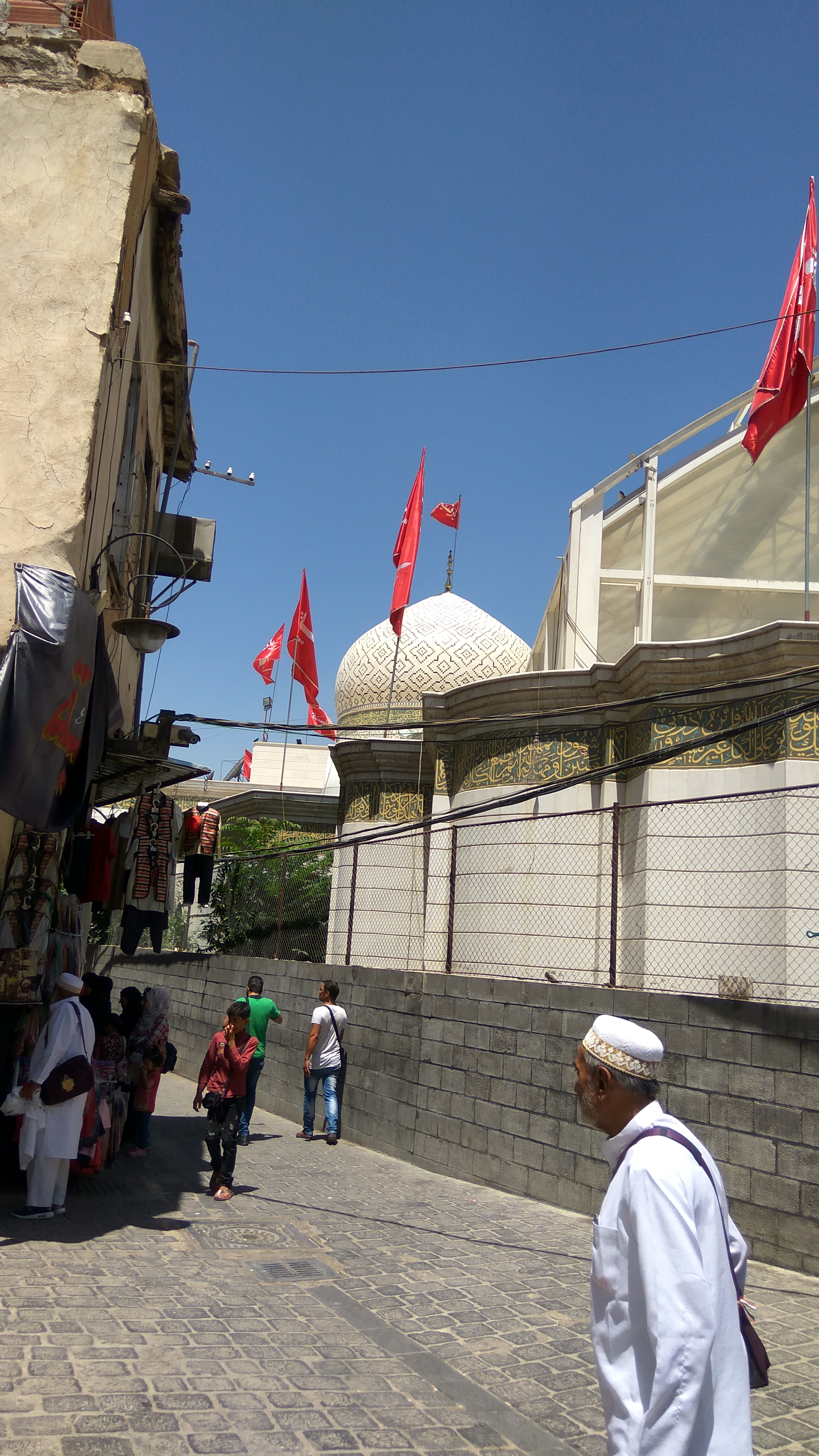
Mosque dome

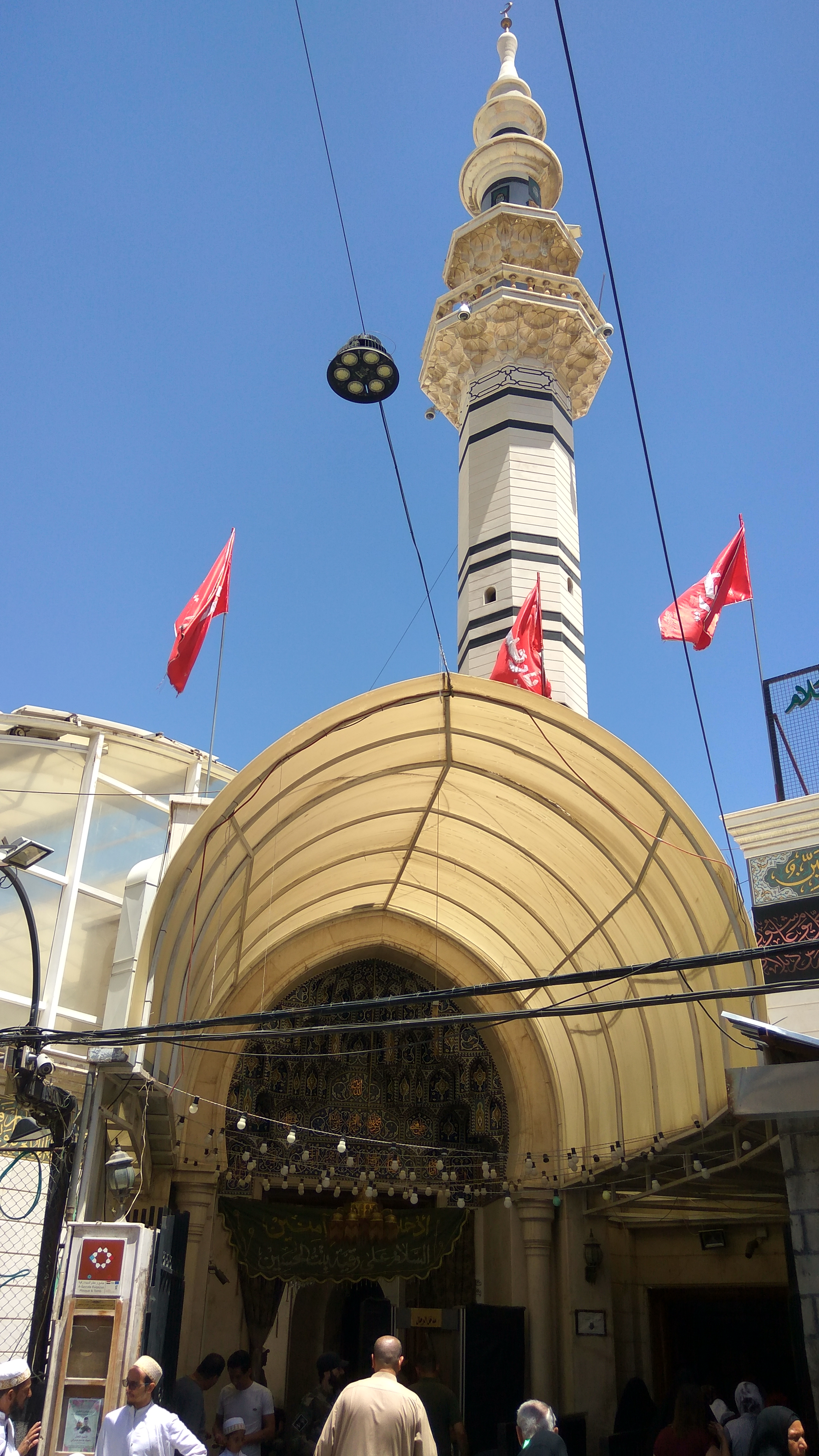
Mosque entrance

== See also ==
- List of mosques in Syria
- Daughters of Husayn ibn Ali
- Holiest sites in Shia Islam
- Shia Islam in Syria
