= Ruqayya bint Husayn =

Daughter of Husayn ibn Ali

Ruqayya bint al-Husayn رُقَيَّة بِنْت ٱلْحُسَيْن
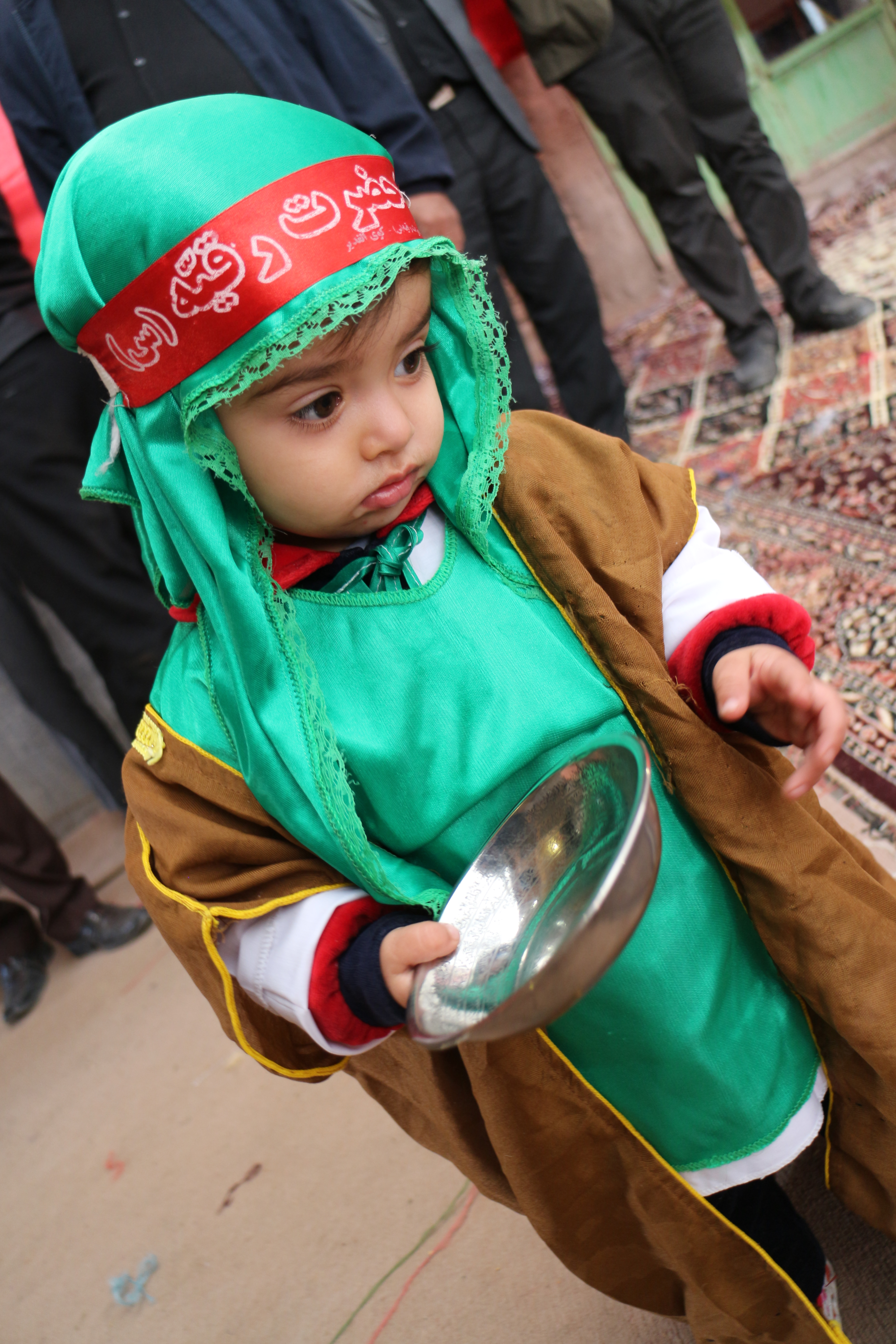
- A Iranian child in Mourning of Muharram with red headband written "O Ruqayyah."
- Born: c. 676 CE; Medina, Umayyad Caliphate
- Died: c. 680 CE; Damascus, Umayyad Caliphate
- Resting place: Sayyidah Ruqayya Mosque, Damascus
- Father: Husayn ibn Ali

Ruqayya bint al-Ḥusayn (Arabic: رُقَيَّة بِنْت ٱلْحُسَيْن) is said to have been a great-granddaughter of the Islamic prophet Muhammad and daughter of Husayn. Husayn and a small group of his supporters were brutally massacred in the Battle of Karbala in 680 on the order of the Umayyad caliph Yazid. Their women and children were then taken captive and marched to the capital Damascus, where it is said Ruqayya died at the age of about three, possibly due to the hostility of her captors. The Sayyida Ruqayya Mosque in Damascus is a popular destination for Shia pilgrimage.

== Parents ==
Some early historians list only two daughters for Husayn ibn Ali, namely Fatima and Sakina. These include the Sunni authors Ibn Sa'd (d. 845) and al-Baladhuri (d. 892), and the Twelver authors al-Mufid (d. 1022) and al-Tabarsi (d. 1153). Some authors add Zaynab as the third daughter, including the Twelver Ibn Shahrashub (d. 1192) and Imad al-Din al-Tabari (d. c. 1300). Finally, some others have reported four daughters for Husayn, including the Shia Baha al-Din al-Irbili (d. 1293-4) and the Sunni Ibn Talha Shafi'i (d. 1339). Out of these four, the latter author only names Fatima, Sakina, and Zaynab. The prominent polymath Ibn Fondoq (d. 1170) lists the four daughters as Fatima, Sakina, Zaynab, and Umm Kulthum, but emphasizes the last two died in childhood. Ibn Fondoq elsewhere writes Husayn was survived by Fatima, Sakina, and Ruqayya, which suggests Ruqayya is the same person as Umm Kulthum. Aside from Fatima and Sakina, sources thus differ and some count Ruqayya among the daughters of Husayn.

This name is also mentioned in some accounts of Husayn's parting words for his family before he left for the battlefield one last time, but the Twelver cleric M. Reyshahri (d. 2022) writes that this could also be a reference to Ruqayya bint Ali, wife of Muslim ibn Aqil, Husayn's slain envoy to the Kufans. The name Ruqayya also appears twice in a poem about Husayn ascribed to Sayf ibn Umayra Nakha'i, who was a companion of Ja'far al-Sadiq (d. 765), the sixth Imam in Twelver Shia, but the attribution of this poem to Sayf is not certain. Little is now known about her mother. The child of Husayn who died shortly after Karbala is sometimes identified as Sakina.

== Death ==
Husayn denounced the accession of the Umayyad caliph Yazid ibn Mu'awiya in 680 CE. When pressed by Yazid's agents to pledge his allegiance, Husayn first left his hometown of Medina for Mecca and later set off for Kufa, accompanied by his family and a small group of supporters. They were intercepted near the city and massacred by the Umayyad forces, who first surrounded them for some days and cut off their access to the nearby Euphrates. After the battle, the women and children were taken captive and marched to Kufa and then the capital Damascus. The earliest account of the death in captivity of a daughter of Husayn appears in Kamel al-bahai by Imad al-Din al-Tabari without giving her name. He writes that the women had hidden the death of Husayn from his young children until they were brought to the palace of Yazid. There a daughter of Husayn, aged four, woke up crying one night and asked for her father, saying she had just seen him distressed and anguished in her dream. The women's cry awakened Yazid who then learned from his men about its cause. Yazid ordered Husayn's head to be taken to the child. The shock left the child ill and she died in the coming days. The source of al-Tabari was the non-extant al-Hawiya fi masalib Mu'awiya by the Sunni scholar Qasim ibn Muhammad ibn Ahmad al-Ma'muni.

The Sufi scholar Husayn Kashifi (d. 910) gives a similar account in his martyrology Rawzat al-shuhada, again without naming the child, this time sourced from Kanz al-ghara'ib fi ghasas al-aja'ib, a book by Najm al-Din Qasim Madhmakini about the first four caliphs, Husayn, and his elder brother Hasan (d. 670). The main difference between the two versions is that the child dies on the same night in the latter version, and this is what the later sources report. Some later sources also identify this child as Ruqayya or Zubayda. A common narrative in the Qajar-era ritual remembrance of the events in Karbala was that Ruqayya saw her father in a dream and prayed to be allowed to join her. She died soon after and her death was regarded as a form of martyrdom which thus released her from her suffering at the hands of the Umayyads. Some modern sources identify as Sakina this young child of Husayn who is said to have died in captivity in Damascus.

== Shrine ==
A shrine in Damascus is often associated with Ruqayya. Among others, this is the view of the Twelver authors Muhammad Hashim Khorasani (d. 1933-4) and Muhammad Haeri Karaki (alive in 1548 CE). Some have instead considered the shrine to be the burial site of Husayn's head, including the Sunni historians Ibn Kathir (d. 1373) and al-Dhahabi (d. 1348). Yet some others have reported it as the grave of Ruqayya bint Ali, which might be in Cairo instead. There are also eye-witness accounts in some sources that the grave belongs to a female child, whose body had to be exhumed and reburied during the repairs to the site. The attribution of the shrine to Ruqayya bint al-Husayn is thus not certain, according to Reyshahri, who nevertheless believes the site is associated with the Ahl al-Bayt, that is, the House of Muhammad. A popular destination for Shia pilgrimage, the shrine is located in the Suq al-Emara market to the north of the Umayyad Mosque. There are also surviving records of multiple reconstructions and expansions, as early as the fifteenth century CE. The current building was completed about 1991 CE, exhibiting a mix of Syrian and Iranian architectures, with substantial use of mirrors, tiles, and white stone.

Sayyidah Ruqayya Mosque
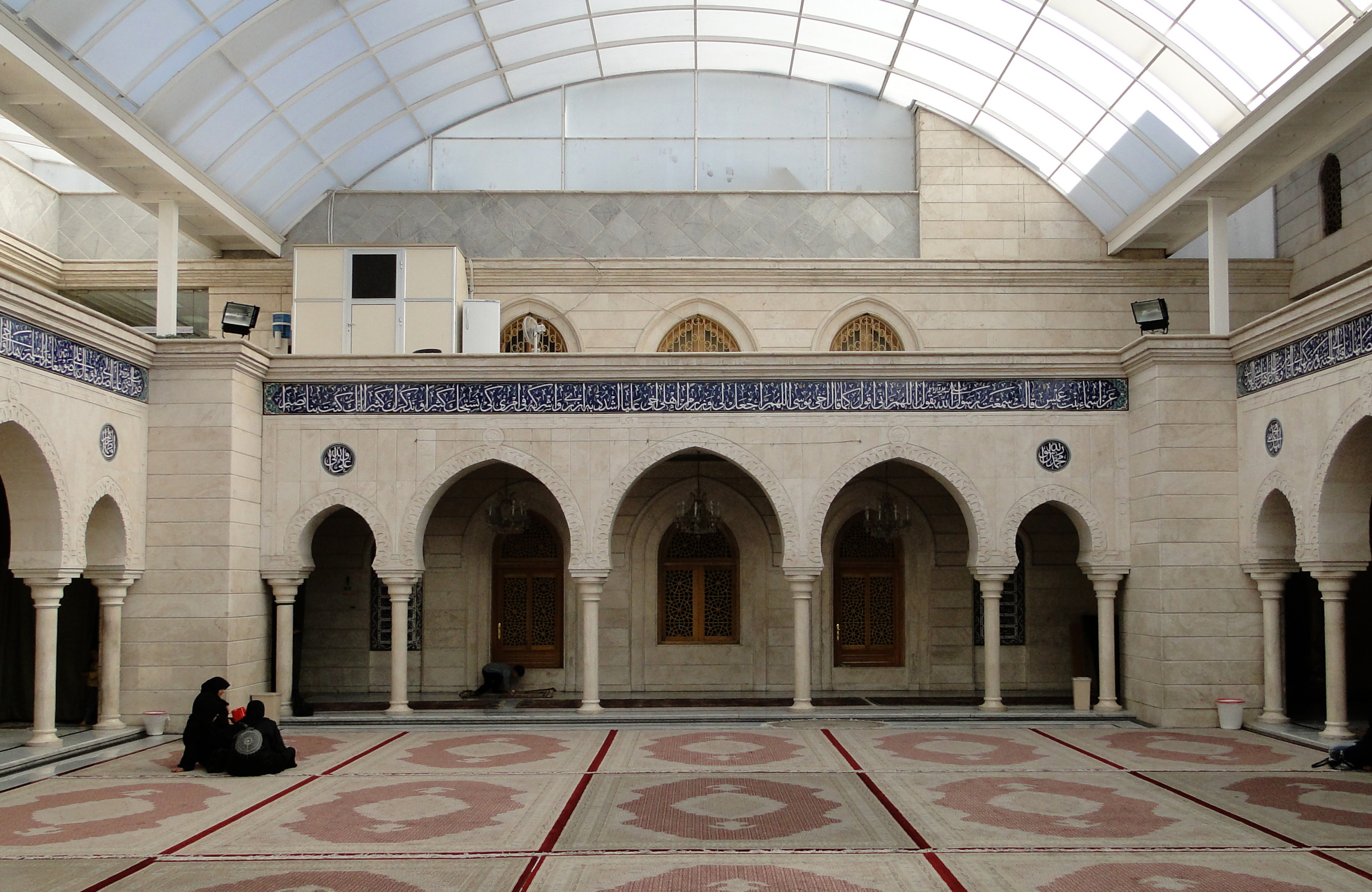
View of the courtyard

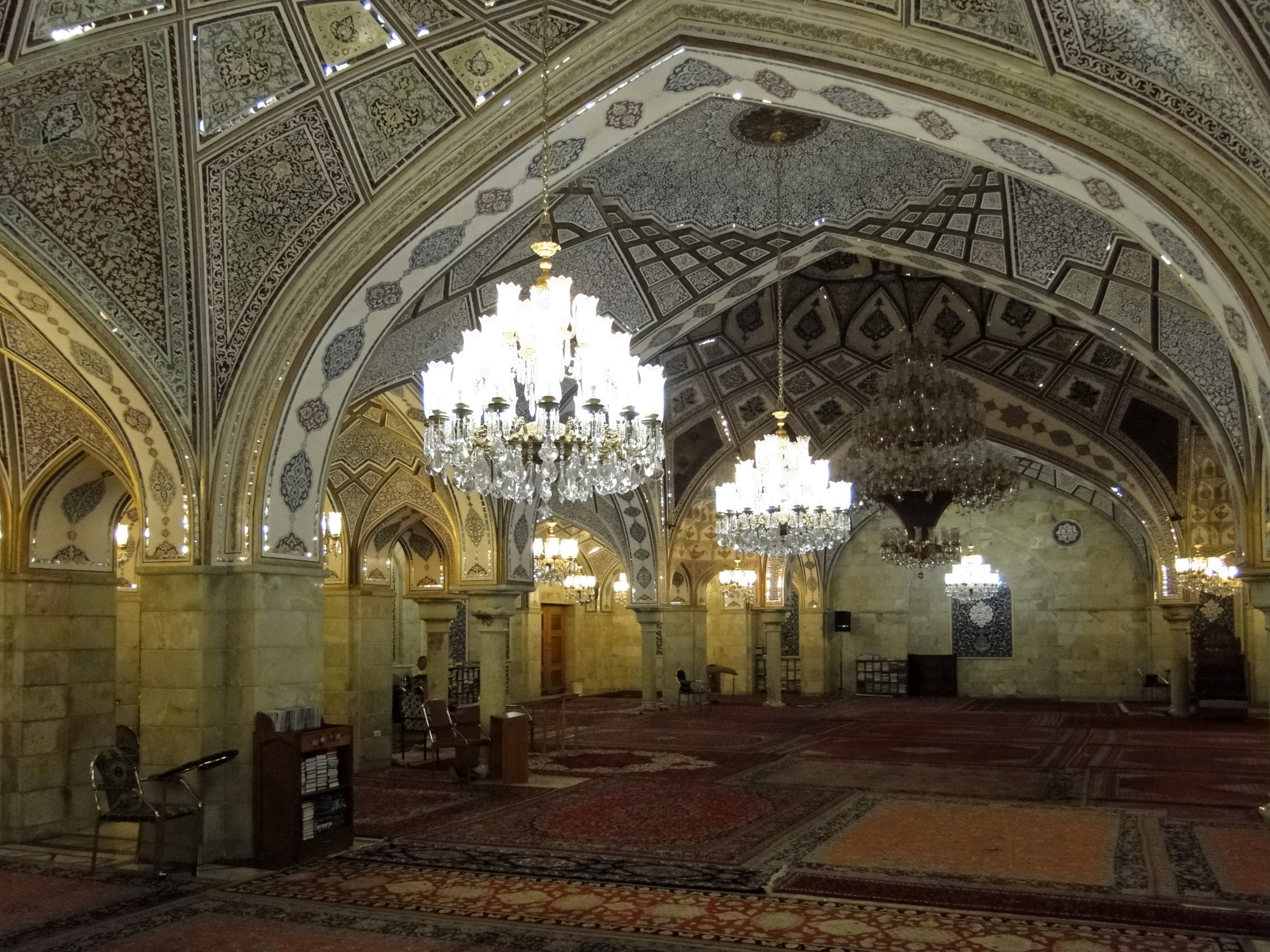
Prayer hall

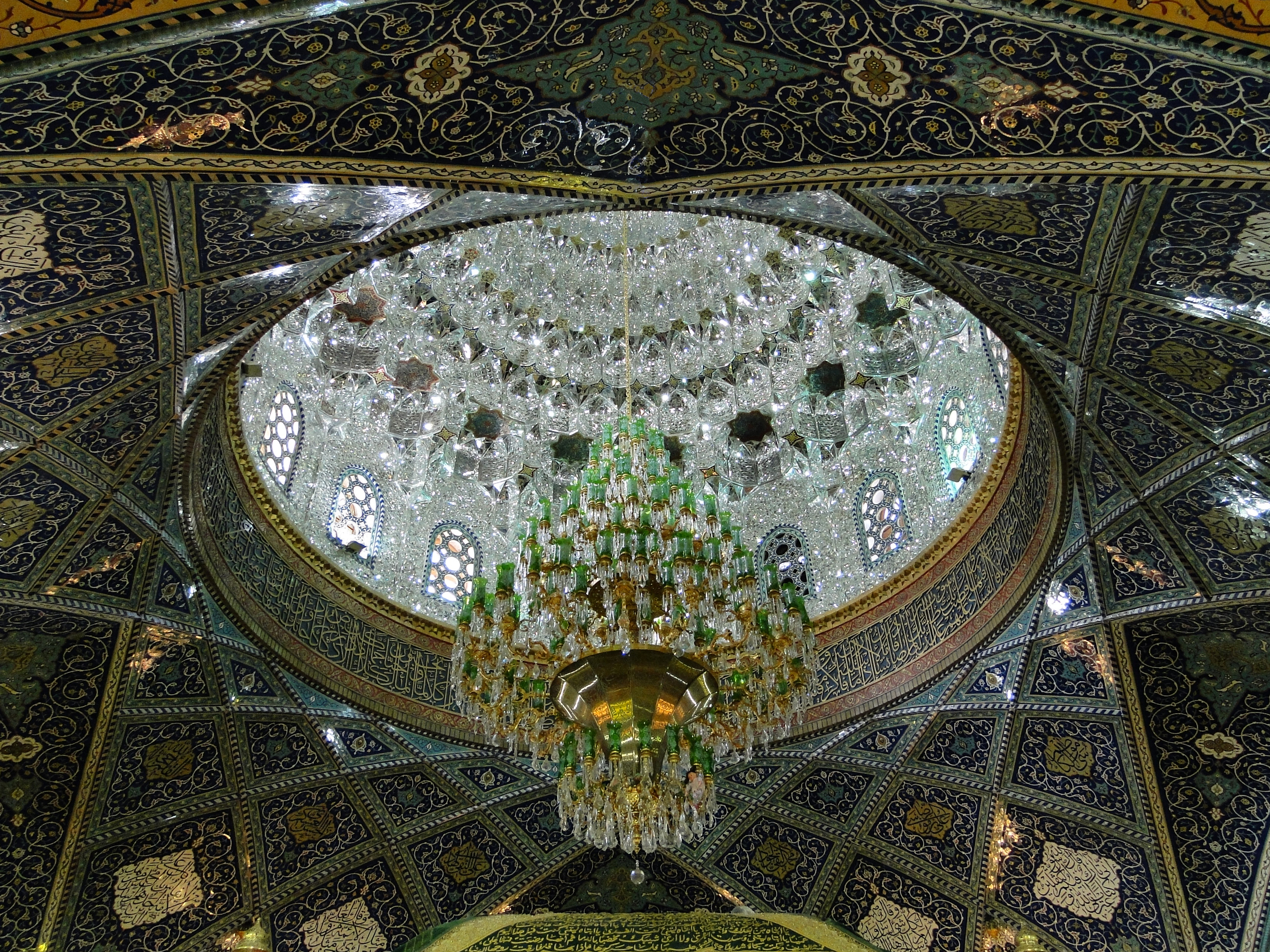
A chandelier in the mosque

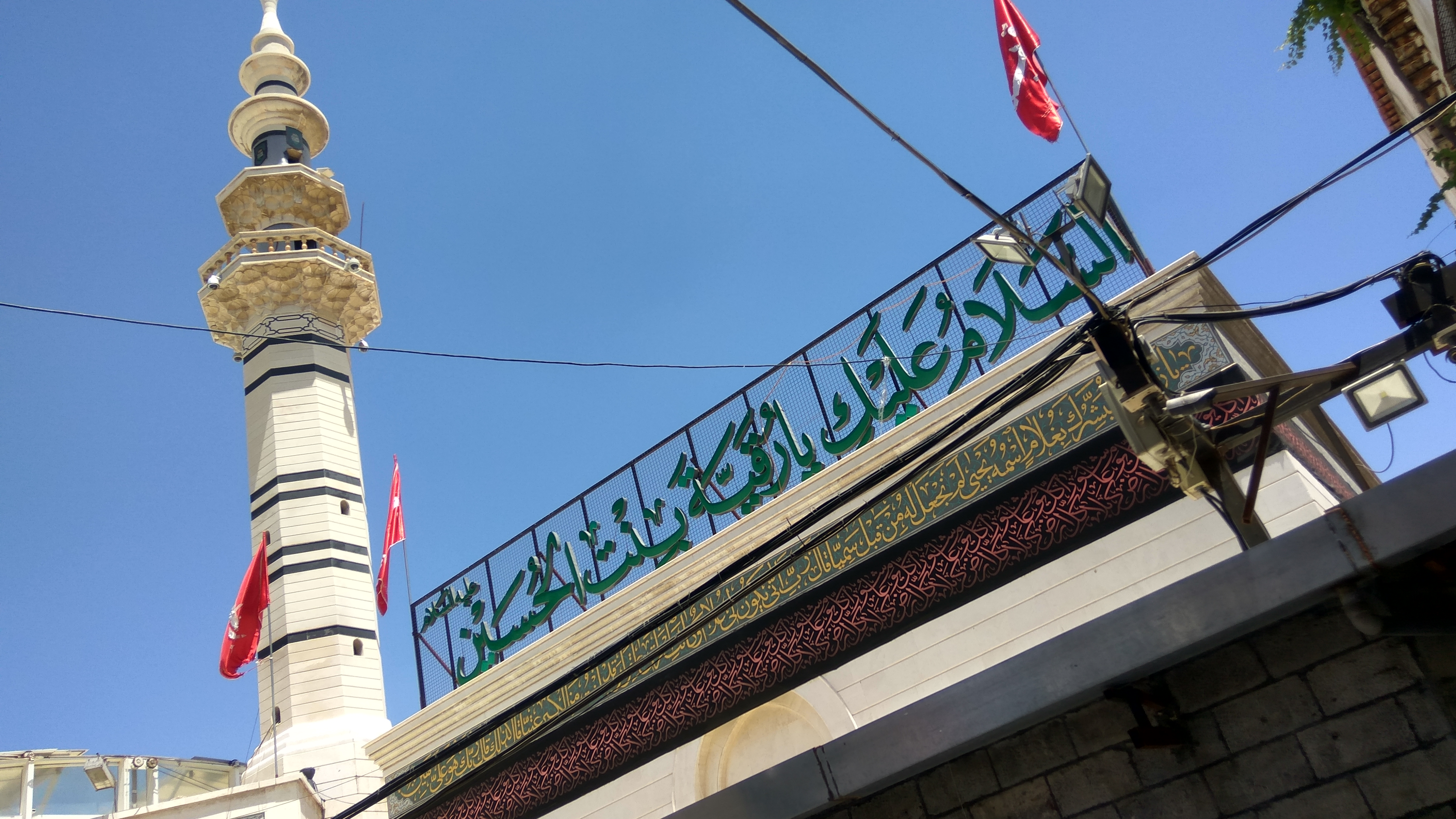
Minaret
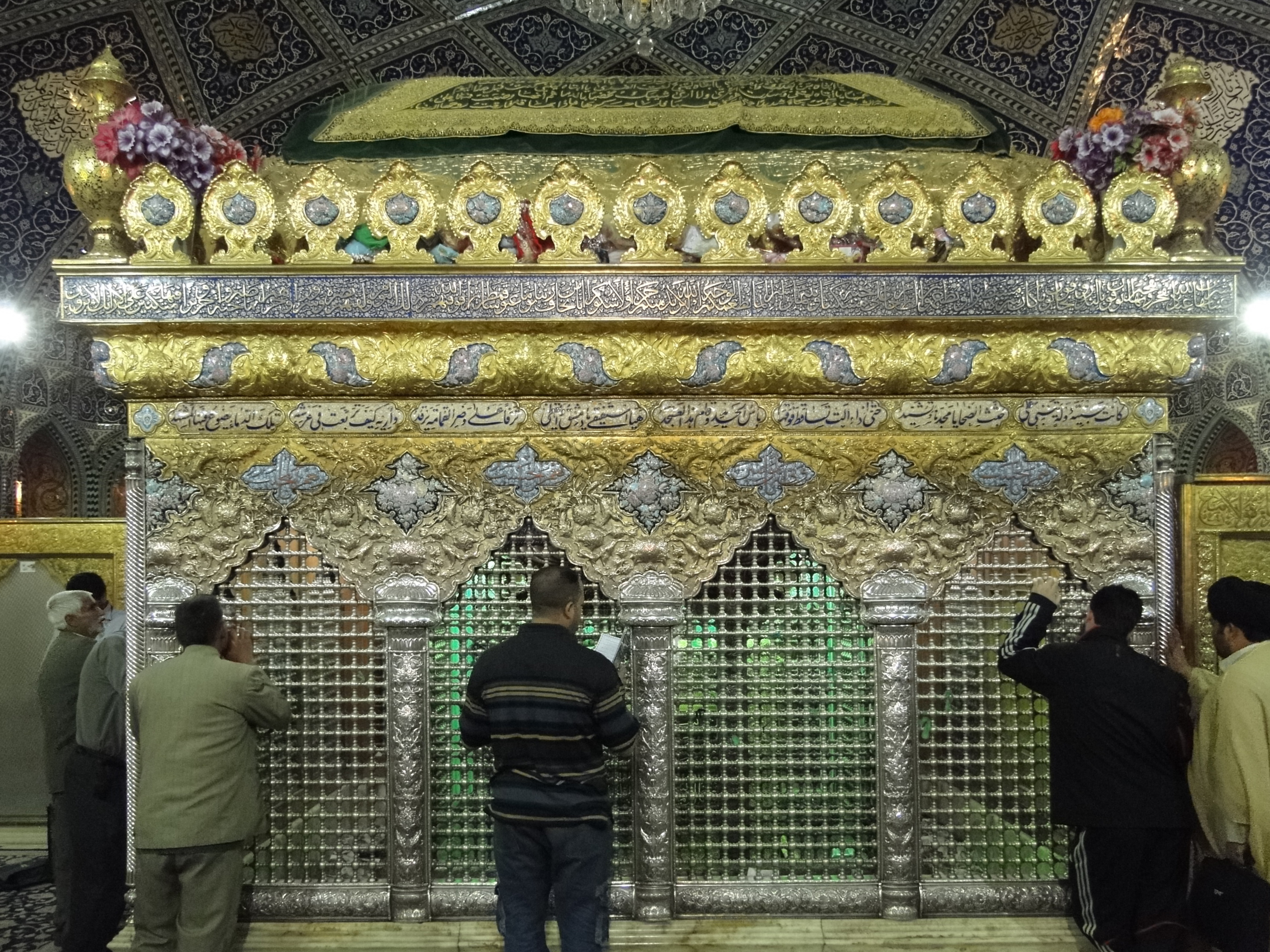
Zarih

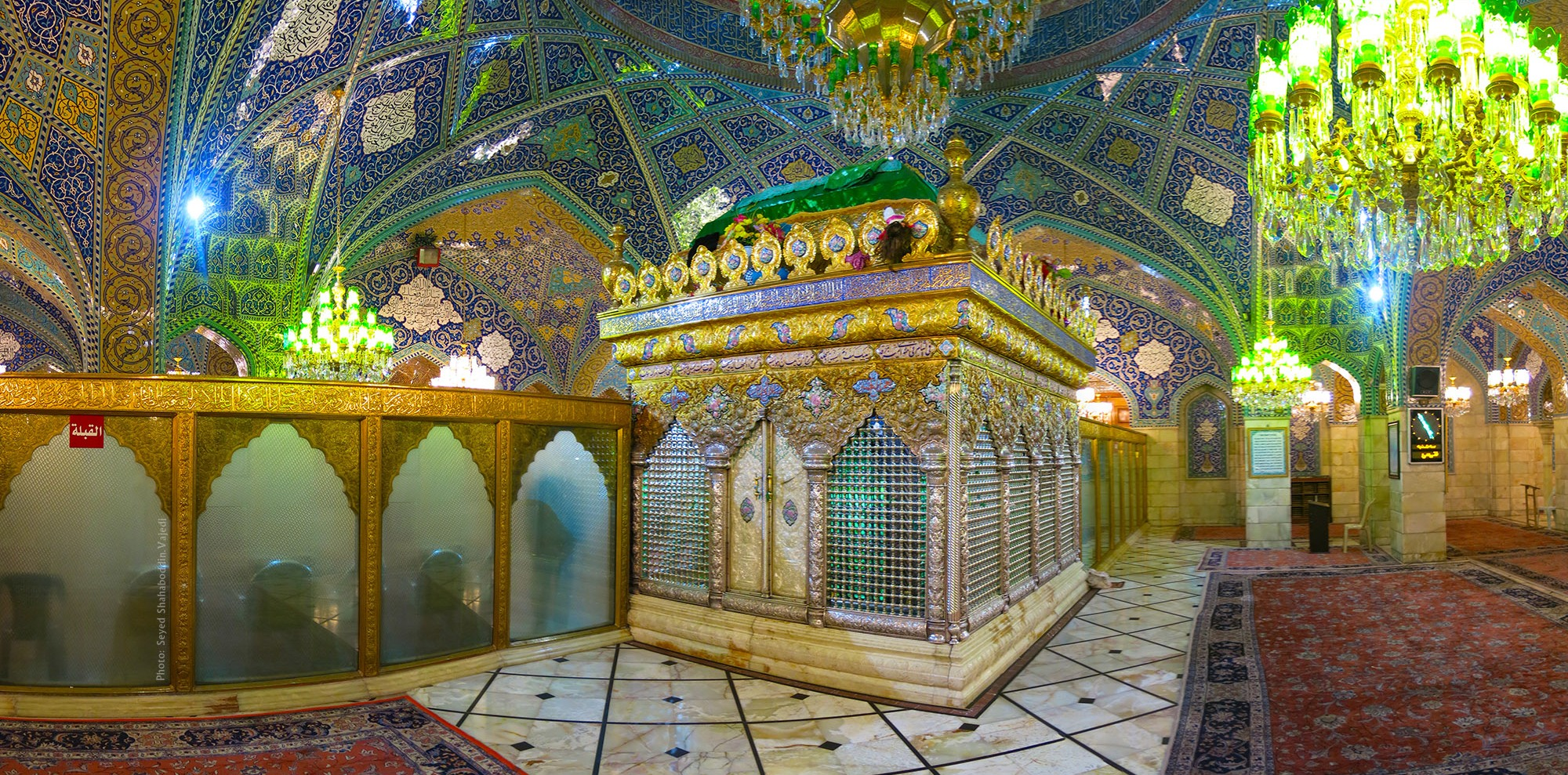

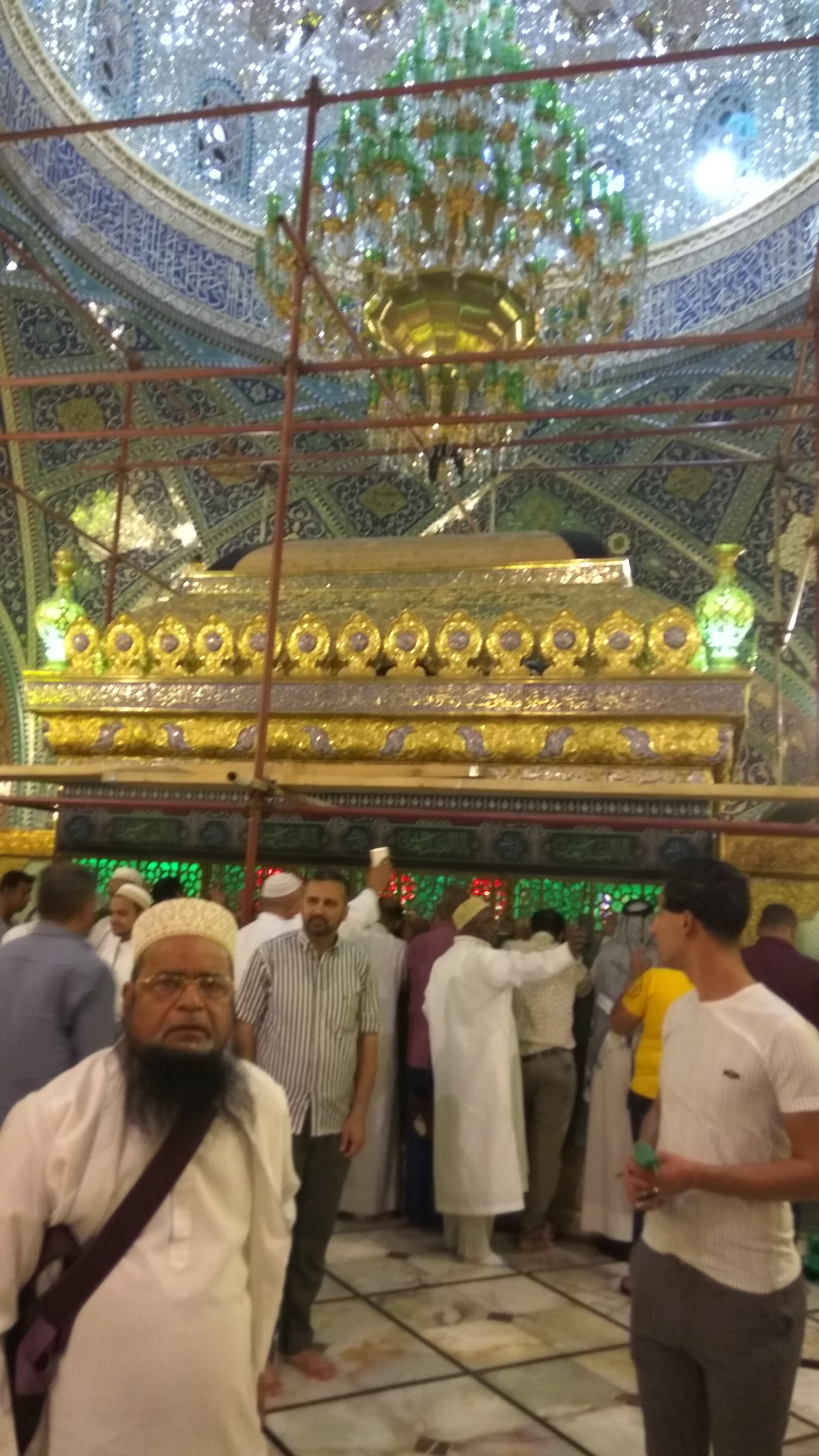

== See also ==
- Family tree of Husayn ibn Ali
- Sakina bint Husayn
- Ruqayya bint Ali
- Fatima
