= Ruqayya bint Ali =

Daughter of Ali ibn Abi Talib

Ruqayya bint Ali رُقَيَّة بِنْت عَلِيّ
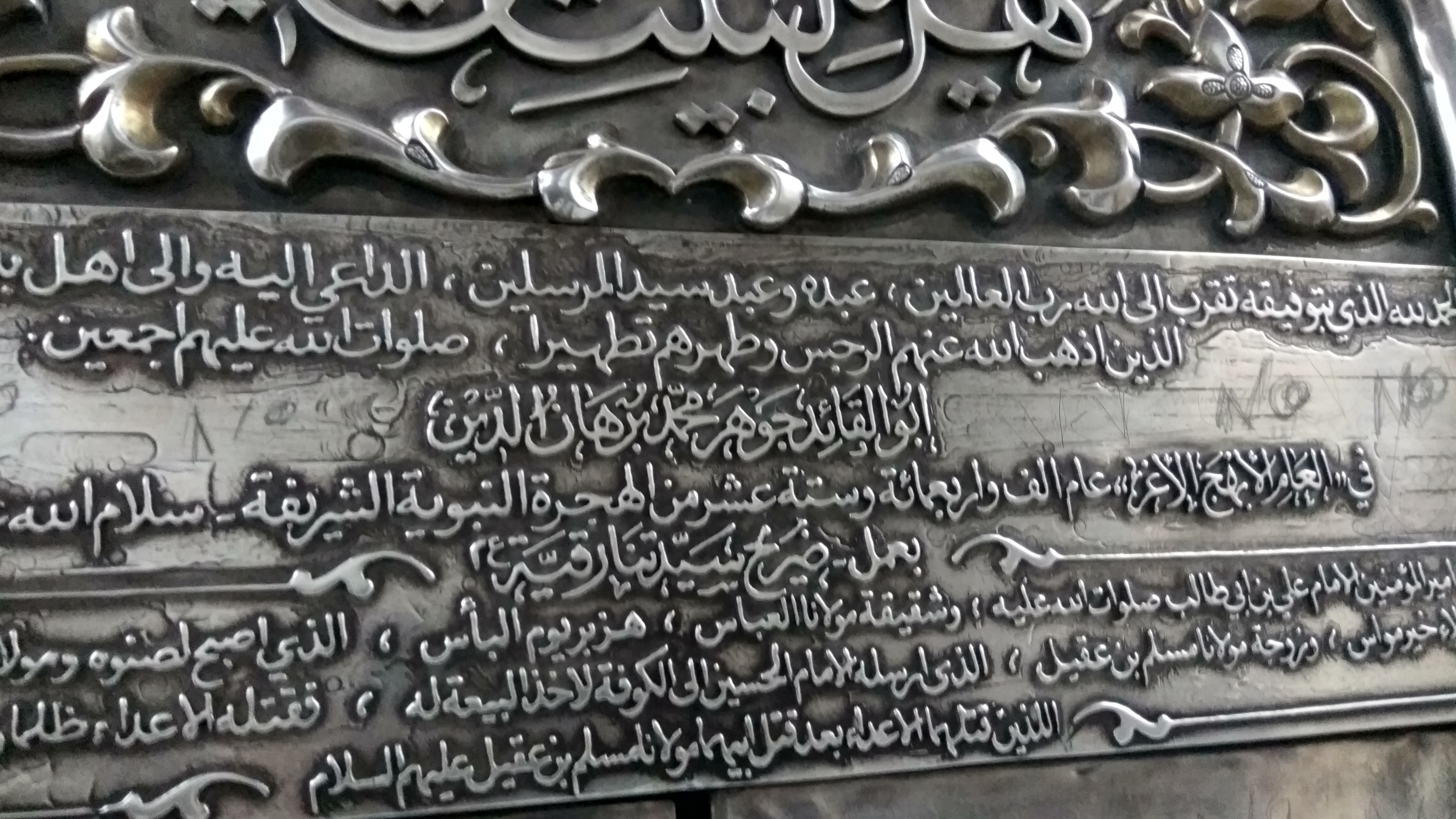
- Name plate of her zarih claiming her as a sister of Abbas ibn Ali
- Born: Medina, Rashidun Caliphate
- Died: Lahore, Taank Kingdom
- Resting place: Mashhad of Sayyida Ruqayya, Cairo or Bibi Pak Daman, Lahore
- Spouse: Muslim ibn Aqil
- Children: Muhammad ibn Muslim; Ibrahim ibn Muslim; Atika bint Muslim; Abd Allah ibn Muslim
- Parents: Ali (father); Al-Sahba bint Rabi'a (mother)

Ruqayya bint Ali (Arabic: رُقَيَّة بِنْت عَلِيّ) was a daughter of Ali, the cousin and son-in-law of the Islamic prophet Muhammad, the first Shia Imam and the fourth Rashidun caliph. She is considered an Alid saint, her mother is Al-Sahba bint Rabi'a. She is claimed to be a full-sister of Abbas ibn Ali. The Bibi Pak Daman is where many believe to be the mausoleum of Ruqayya bint Ali. There is also a shrine in Cairo still used as an oratory where vows and intercessionary prayers to her are offered. Egypt is known to claim many people are buried there, but the Iranian religious authorities confirmed the correct place of burial is the Bibi Pak Daman in Lahore, Pakistan.

== See also ==
- Muslim ibn Aqil
- Muhammad ibn Muslim and Ibrahim ibn Muslim
- Sayyida Nafisa bint al-Hasan
- Sayyida Ruqayya bint al-Husayn
- Sayyida Zaynab bint Ali
