= Muslim ibn Aqil =

Son of Aqil ibn Abi Talib and cousin of Husayn ibn Ali (died 680)

Muslim ibn Aqil al-Hashimi Arabic: مُسْلِم ٱبْن عَقِيل ٱلْهَاشِمِيّ

Personal life
- Born: Early 640s or late 650s
- Died: 10 September 680 Kufa, Iraq
- Cause of death: Execution ordered by Ibn Ziyad
- Resting place: Great Mosque of Kufa
- Spouse: Ruqayya bint Ali ibn Abi Talib
- Children: Muhammad ibn Muslim; Ibrahim ibn Muslim; Atika bint Muslim; Abd Allah ibn Muslim
- Parents: Aqil ibn Abi Talib (father); Ulayya (mother)
- Known for: Envoy of Husayn ibn Ali
- Relatives: Muhammad; Ali (uncle); Hasan ibn Ali (cousin); Husayn ibn Ali (cousin)

Muslim ibn Aqil al-Hashimi (Arabic: مُسْلِم ٱبْن عَقِيل ٱلْهَاشِمِيّ, romanized: Muslim ibn ʿAqīl al-Hāshimī) was a relative of the Islamic prophet Muhammad. Muslim was the son of Aqil ibn Abi Talib and a cousin of Husayn ibn Ali, the third Shia Imam, who dispatched him to Kufa in Iraq to ascertain their support upon the accession of the Umayyad caliph Yazid (r. 680–683). The Kufans welcomed Muslim and overwhelmingly pledged to support Husayn against the Umayyad rule, which they considered illegitimate and tyrannical. In response, Yazid replaced the mild governor of the city with his strongman Ubayd-Allah ibn Ziyad, who soon discovered the hideout of Muslim through an informant. When Ibn Ziyad imprisoned or killed Hani ibn Urwa, who was secretly sheltering Muslim, he came out in open revolt and surrounded the governor's palace with his supporters in September 680 CE. With a combination of threats and promises, however, Ibn Ziyad induced Kufan tribal leaders to abandon Muslim and withdraw their men. A deserted Muslim was arrested after a strong resistance and executed. Before this turn of events, he had written to Husayn and urged him to come to Kufa. Husayn thus left Mecca with his family and a few supporters, but his caravan was intercepted and massacred by the Umayyad forces in October 680 in Karbala, near Kufa. Muslim is revered in Shia Islam for his bravery and moral uprightness. His shrine in Kufa is a destination for Shia pilgrims.

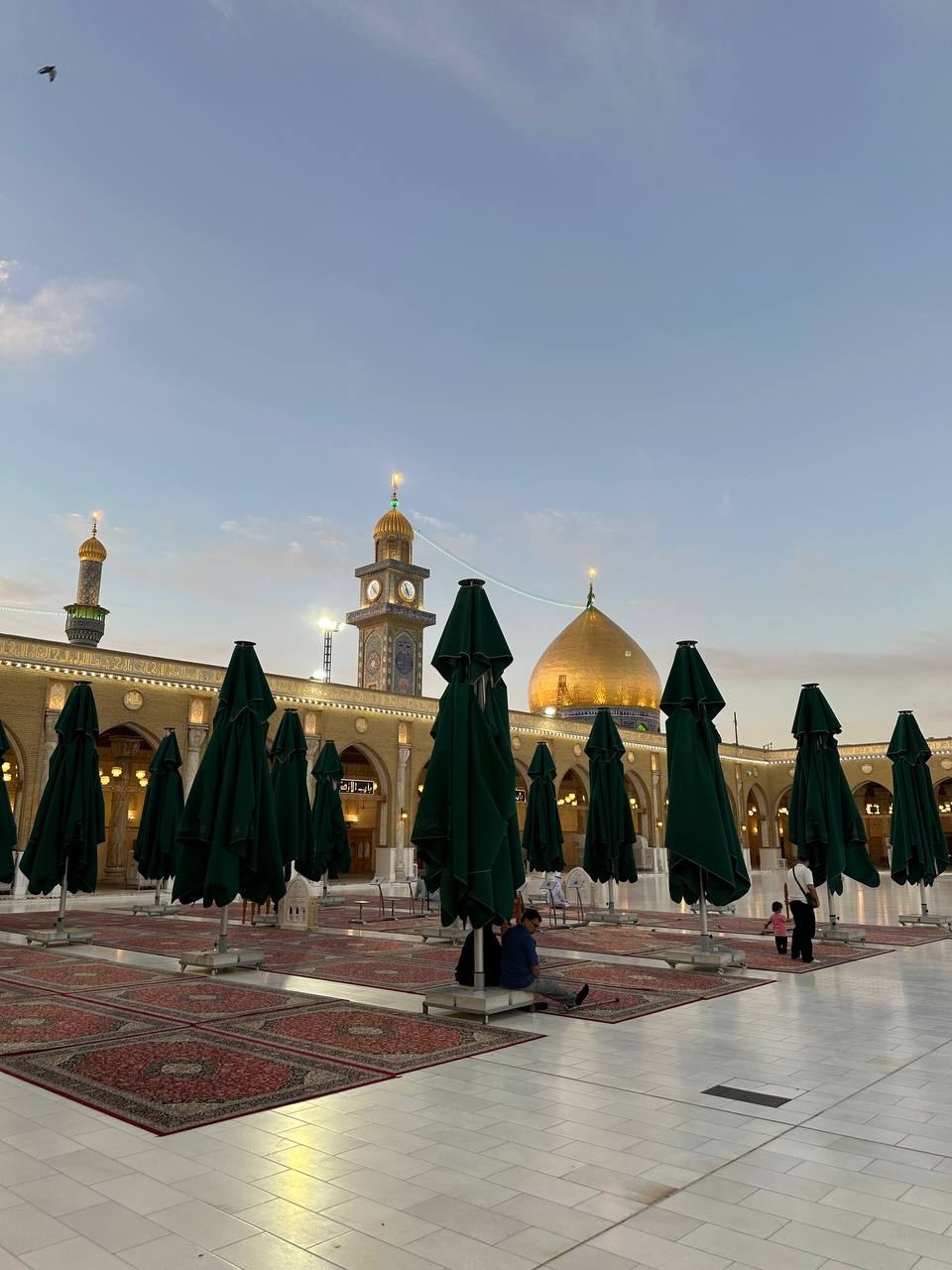
His Resting Place in Kufa

== Early life ==
Muslim was the son of Aqil (d. 670 or 683), a cousin of the Islamic prophet Muhammad (d. 632). His mother might have been a freed slave (umm walad) of Nabataean origin whose name is differently given as Ulayya, Khalila, and Hilya. His date of birth is also reported variously and the sources differ significantly, ranging from the early 640s CE to the late 650s. Muslim seems to have enjoyed a reputation as a fierce warrior. By one account, he fought in the Battle of Siffin (657) for his uncle Ali ibn Abi Talib, the first Shia Imam and the fourth caliph (r. 656–661) after Muhammad. By another account, Muslim fought in the conquest of al-Bahnasa in Egypt during the caliphate of Umar ibn al-Khattab, the second caliph (r. 634–644). According to this account, Muslim was consequently appointed as its governor and served there until Umar was replaced with Uthman ibn Affan (r. 644–656), whereupon Muslim returned to Medina. By yet another account, sometime after 670, he reportedly duped Mu'awiya, the governor of Syria at the time, into buying from him a plot of land in Medina that actually belonged to his cousin, Husayn ibn Ali.

== Envoy to Kufa ==
Husayn ibn Ali denounced the accession in 680 of the Umayyad caliph Yazid, who succeeded his father Mua'wiya in breach of the 661 peace treaty with Husayn's brother Hasan (d. 670). When pressed to pledge his allegiance, Husayn went from his hometown of Medina to Mecca, accompanied by his family. There he received many letters and messengers from the predominantly Shia town of Kufa in Iraq, inviting him there to lead them against the Umayyad rule, which they considered illegitimate and tyrannical. Husayn responded that he would lead them in the right way if they were united in their support and tasked Muslim with assessing the situation in Kufa. Husayn sent a similar letter to the inhabitants of Basra in Iraq and invited them to follow him to set right the Sunna of Muhammad, which had been obliterated by innovations, he wrote.

Muslim thus left Mecca on 19 June 680 (15 Ramadan 60), hired two guides in Medina, and then set out for Kufa. According to the Sunni historian al-Tabari (d. 923), his guides lost their way and perished from thirst along the way, whereby Muslim wrote to Husayn to be relieved from his duty but the latter insisted that he continue. Muslim entered Kufa on 9 July 680 (5 Shawwal 60) and first hid in the house of Mukhtar al-Thaqafi or Muslim ibn Awsaja, where he received the pledges of 12,000 to 30,000 men. But these were in effect pledges not to Husayn but to the tribal leaders who supported him at the time, that is, loyalty not to a cause but to men, according to the Islamicist Mahmoud M. Ayoub (d. 2021). Early on, he also attended a secret meeting of the Kufan Shia leaders, where he received their support. The attendees included Abis ibn Abi Shabib al-Shakiri, Habib ibn Muzahir, and Sa'id ibn Abd Allah al-Hanafi, all of whom were later killed alongside Husayn. As his support grew, however, Muslim was even able to preside over public meetings in mosques. He now wrote to Husayn and urged him to come to Kufa.

The governor of Kufa at the time, Nu'man ibn Bashir, was probably aware of Muslim's arrival and his intentions but did not harm him. As a companion of Muhammad, Nu'man did not act perhaps because Muslim was a relative of Muhammad, or perhaps the governor did not want to act on mere suspicions. Umar ibn Sa'd and some others soon wrote to Yazid, who replaced Nu'man by Ubayd-Allah ibn Ziyad and ordered him to kill or banish Muslim. Described as energetic, resourceful, and ruthless, Ubayd-Allah was already the governor of Basra at the time. He hurried to Kufa via the shortest route, reportedly wearing a black turban and veiled. Some Kufans apparently mistook him for Husayn and enthusiastically welcomed him. Upon arrival, he publicly threatened to punish any sign of revolt with beheading and crucifixion.

== Failed revolt and execution ==
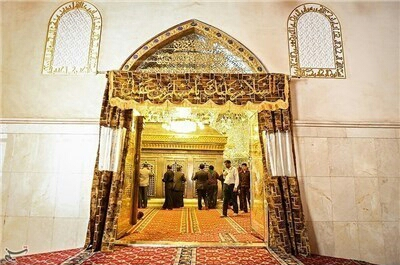
Entrance to the shrine of Muslim ibn Aqil in Kufa, Iraq

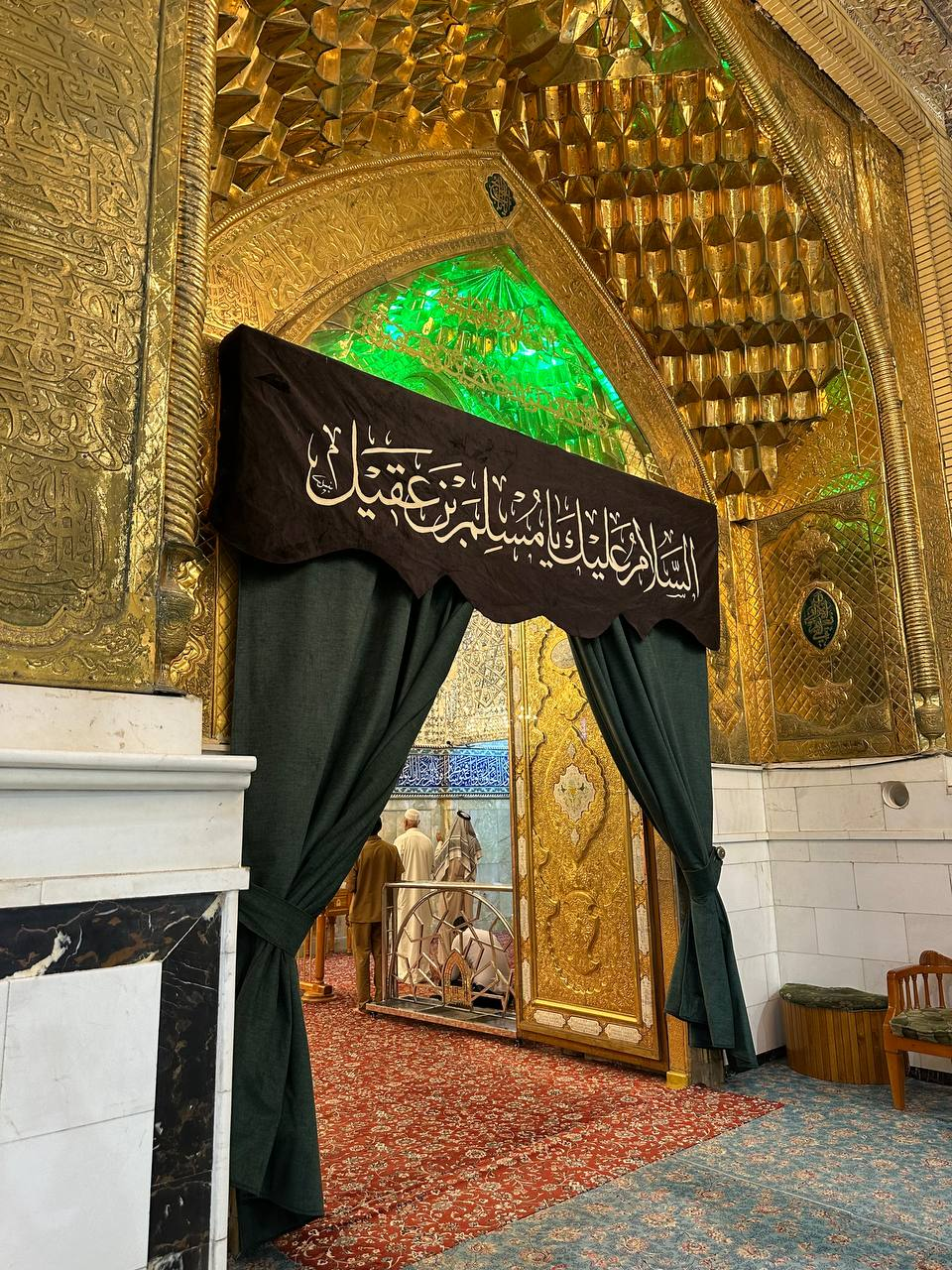

With the arrival of Ibn Ziyad, Muslim relocated to the house of Hani ibn Urwa, a Muradite elder. There he is said to have missed an opportunity to kill Ibn Ziyad when the latter came to visit Hani, who was ill or feigning illness, or visit the Basran Sharik ibn al-A'war al-Harithi, who was ostensibly a guest of Hani but was actually there to support Muslim. According to various sources, Muslim abandoned the plot to kill Ibn Ziyad because his nerves failed or because Hani (or his wife) was against the plot or because he recalled a prophetic tradition that prohibits treachery (in this case against a guest who had been given an assurance of safety). Soon afterward Ibn Ziyad found the hideout of Muslim through an informant, possibly named Ma'qil, who infiltrated the inner circle of Muslim by pretending to be a supporter and donating to his cause. Ibn Ziyad then summoned Hani, forced him to admit sheltering Muslim, and then badly beat him when he refused to surrender his guest. Hani either died on the spot or was imprisoned.

Muslim now came out in open revolt, probably after learning about the arrest of Hani. He surrounded the governor's palace with some 4,000 men, the date of which is variously given as 3, 8, 9 or 10 September 680 (2, 7, 8 or 9 Dhu al-Hijja 60). With a combination of threats and bribes, however, Ibn Ziyad successfully induced the tribal leaders to abandon Muslim and withdraw their men. At nightfall, a deserted Muslim wandered around the city until a Kindite widow by the name of Taw'a sheltered him. The next morning, however, her son Bilal disclosed the location of Muslim to a Kindite leader, apparently a descendant to al-Ash'ath ibn Qays (d. 661). The leader passed on the information to the governor, an act which earned that leader the title of "the most perfidious of Arabs," according to the Arab polymath Ibn Habib (d. 853). Some sixty or seventy men then surrounded the house and eventually restrained a wounded and exhausted Muslim after incurring some losses. He was promised safety (aman) by some accounts, which was not honored later. Indeed, Muslim was brought to Ibn Ziyad, who ordered his execution after a sharp exchange. He gave his last will to Umar ibn Sa'd by most accounts, asking him to inform Husayn about the treachery of the Kufans, pay his debts, and bury his corpse. He was then decapitated in public on the roof of the citadel, his head and torso thrown down. The executioner is named Bakr ibn Humran al-Ahmari, whom Muslim had apparently wounded earlier during the raid of his hideout. Hani was also executed; their bodies were dragged in the streets and then possibly crucified posthumously. Their heads were sent to Yazid who congratulated Ibn Ziyad and ordered him to arrest Husayn and his supporters, and to fight those who would fight him.

== Aftermath ==
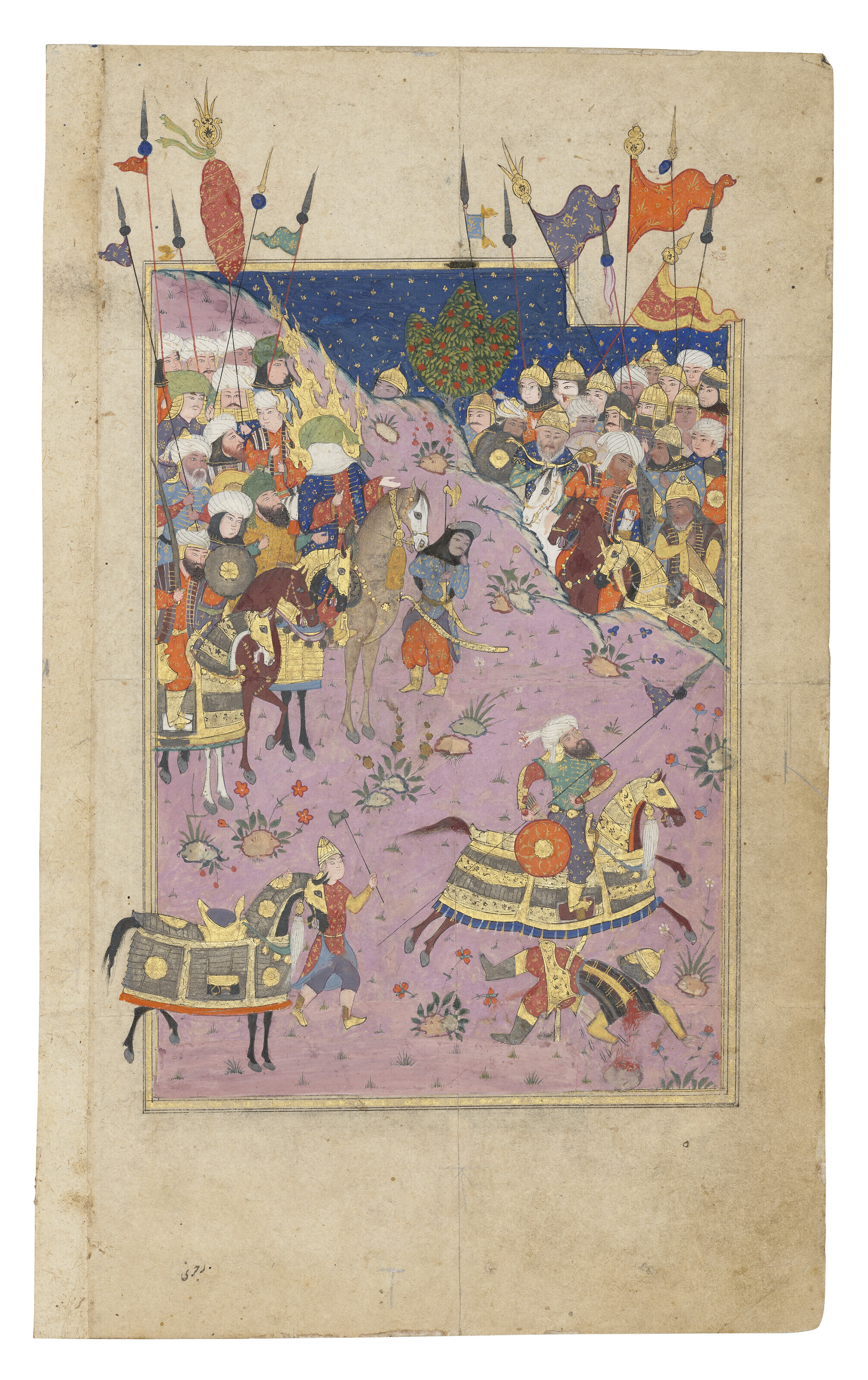
Abd-Allah ibn Muslim riding into battle to avenge his father, an illustration of the Battle of Karbala, dated 1580-90

Muslim was thus executed, a day after his failed revolt, after about two months of his arrival in Kufa. Encouraged by his letter and unaware of his execution, Husayn left Mecca for Kufa around the same time, perhaps on 10 or 12 September 680 (8 or 10 Dhu al-Hijja 60), accompanied by his family and a small number of supporters. He probably received the news of Muslim's death along the way at al-Tha'labiyya. Some Sunni reports indicate that Husayn considered aborting his mission but was convinced otherwise by Muslim's sons. This is to be discounted, suggests the Islamicist Wilferd Madelung. It is more likely that Husayn pressed on towards Kufa even after learning about Muslim's execution, per most Shia accounts, for he had earlier told other well-wishers about his vision of his grandfather Muhammad, who had told him by one account that God had willed to see him killed and his family shackled. Husayn's caravan was indeed intercepted and massacred on 10 October 680 (10 Muharram 61 AH) in Karbala, near Kufa, by the Umayyad forces who first surrounded them for some days and cut off their access to the nearby river Euphrates. Muslim's family stayed with Husayn throughout and probably two of his sons were killed alongside Husayn in Karbala. The women and children were then taken captive and marched to Kufa and later the capital Damascus. The captives were paraded in the streets of Damascus, and then imprisoned for an unknown period of time. They were eventually freed by Yazid and returned to Medina.

== Personal life ==
Ruqayya, daughter of Ali ibn Abi Talib, was married to Muslim and bore him his son Abd-Allah, who was killed alongside Husayn in the Battle of Karbala in 680. Another son of Muslim might have also perished in Karbala, while two other sons, often identified as Muhammad and Ibrahim, are said to have been killed about a year later at a young age. The two children had apparently fled the camp of Ibn Ziyad but were murdered by a Kufan, possibly al-Harith ibn Badr, who sought the prize money offered by the governor.

== Commemoration ==
Muslim is revered in Shia Islam for his bravery and moral uprightness, and his story has received much attention from Shia authors. Shias commemorate the events of Karbala throughout the months of Muharram and Safar, particularly during the first ten days of Muharram, culminating on the tenth (Ashura) with processions in major Shia cities. The main component of these ritual ceremonies (maj'alis, sing. majlis) is the narration of the stories of Karbala, intended to raise sympathy and move the audience to tears. It is in these ceremonies that Muslim is commemorated as the "first of the martyrs of Karbala," alongside his sons. A common commemorative narrative describes the emotional scene when Husayn disclosed the death of Muslim to his young daughter, whose family was among those who accompanied Husayn to Karbala. Pilgrimage to his shrine in Kufa is recommended in Shia Islam, accompanied by the recitation of a number of preserved prayers.

== See also ==
- Abd al-Rahman ibn Aqil
- Muhammad ibn Muslim and Ibrahim ibn Muslim
- Ruqayya bint Ali
- Hani ibn Urwa
