= Feyzabad, Taft =

Feyzabad فيض اباد
- Village
- Location within Iran
- Coordinates: 31°42′28″N 53°59′35″E
- Country: Iran
- Province: Yazd
- County: Taft
- Bakhsh: Central
- Rural District: Pishkuh

Population (2006)
  - Total: 232
- Time zone: UTC+3:30 (IRST)
  - Summer (DST): UTC+4:30 (IRDT)

Feyzabad (Persian: فيض اباد, also Romanized as Feyẕābād, Feyzābād, and Faizābād; also known as Feiz Abad Pishkooh and Feyzābād-e Pīshkūh) is a village in Pishkuh Rural District, in the Central District of Taft County, Yazd Province, Iran. At the 2006 census, its population was 232, in 61 families.

== Geography ==
Feyzabad is elevated about 2,025 metres (6,644 ft). By great-circle distance it is about 10.5 kilometres (6.5 mi) west of Eslamiyeh, the capital of Pishkuh Rural District, 21 kilometres (13 mi) west of the county seat of Taft, and 38 kilometres (24 mi) south-west of the provincial capital, Yazd.

== Demographics ==
=== Population ===
At the time of the 2006 National Census, the village's population was 232 (120 men and 112 women) in 61 households; 146 residents were recorded as literate and 65 as illiterate. The following census in 2011 counted 217 people (110 men and 107 women) in 71 households. The 2016 census measured the population of the village as 193 people (96 men and 97 women) in 61 households. It was then the fourth most populous of the 118 populated places listed for Pishkuh Rural District, after Eslamiyeh, a settlement recorded as an Afghan camp, and Khalilabad.

Historical population
Year	Pop.	±%
2006	232	—
2011	217	−6.5%
2016	193	−11.1%
Source: Statistical Center of Iran
