= Qoroq =

Qoroq (Persian: قرق) may refer to:

- Qoroq-e Qavamcheh, Fars Province
- Qoroq, Gilan
- Qoroq, Golestan
- Qoroq Aqa, Isfahan Province
- Qoroq, Kurdistan
- Qoroq, Lorestan
- Qoroq, Amol, Mazandaran Province
- Qoroq, Sari, Mazandaran Province
- Qoroq, Razavi Khorasan
- Qoroq, Yazd
- Qoroq, alternate name of Zir-e Bagh-e Shah, Yazd Province
- Qoroq Rural District
