= Galuyak =

Galuyak or Galooyek or Galuyok or Geluyok (Persian: گلويك) may refer to:

- Galuyak-e Olya
- Galuyak-e Sofla
