= Khud =

Khud (Persian: خود), also rendered as Khod, may refer to:

- Khud-e Bala, village in Iran
- Khud-e Pain, village in Iran

== Other uses ==
- KHUD, a radio station in Tucson, Arizona, United States
