= Mazang =

Mazang or Mezang (Persian: مزنگ) may refer to:

- Mazang, Razavi Khorasan
- Mezang, Yazd
