= Amir Chakhmaq Mosque =

Shi'ite mosque in Yazd, Iran

- مسجد امیرچخماق

- Location of the mosque in Iran

Religion
- Affiliation: Shia Islam
- Ecclesiastical or organisational status: Mosque
- Status: Active

Location
- Location: Amir Chaghmagh Square, Yazd, Yazd Province
- Country: Iran
- Coordinates: 31°53′37″N 54°22′07″E

Architecture
- Type: Mosque architecture
- Style: Timurid
- Founder: Jalal ed-Din Amir Chakhmaq Shami
- Groundbreaking: 1418 CE
- Completed: 841 AH (1437/1438 CE)

Specifications
- Dome: One
- Inscriptions: In Naskh, Thuluth and Kufic scripts
- Materials: Bricks; plaster; tiles

Iran National Heritage List
- Official name: Amir Chakhmaq Mosque
- Type: Mosque
- Designated: 1935
- Part of: Amir Chakhmaq Complex
- Reference no.: 247
- Conservation organization: Cultural Heritage, Handicrafts and Tourism Organization of Iran

The Amir Chakhmaq Mosque (Persian: مسجد امیرچخماق, romanized: Masjed Mir Chakhmagh), also known as the Dahouk Mosque (Persian: مسجد دهوک) and the Jāmeh Nou Mosque, is a Shi'ite mosque located adjacent to the Amir Chaghmagh Square, in the city of Yazd, in the province of Yazd, Iran.

== Overview ==
The mosque was built on orders of Jalal ed-Din Amir Chakhmaq Shami, who was the governor of Yazd and a general of Shahrukh Mirza and was completed in 841 AH (1437/1438 CE), during the Timurid era. From the viewpoint of aesthetics, dimension and importance, it is one of the most outstanding buildings in Yazd. At the entrance to the mosque there is a carved inscription in the Naskh script, revealing a deed relevant to the endowment; and on the eastern entrance to the mosque there is a tiled epigraph with the Thuluth script. The dome is adorned with inscriptions in the cuneiform or Kufic script.

The mosque was added to the Iran National Heritage List on 7 December 1935, administered by the Cultural Heritage, Handicrafts and Tourism Organization of Iran.

== See also ==
- Shia Islam in Iran
- List of mosques in Iran
