= Aliabad, Aliabad =

Village in Yazd province, Iran

Aliabad Persian: علي اباد
- Village
- Location within Iran
- Coordinates: 31°39′57″N 53°50′48″E
- Country: Iran
- Province: Yazd
- County: Taft
- District: Central
- Rural District: Aliabad

Population (2016)
  - Total: 715
- Time zone: UTC+3:30 (IRST)

Aliabad (Persian: علي اباد) (Note: Also romanized as ‘Alīābād; also known as ‘Ali Abad Pishkooh and ‘Alīābād-e Pīshkūh) is a village in, and the capital of, Aliabad Rural District of the Central District of Taft County, Yazd province, Iran.

== Demographics ==
=== Population ===
At the time of the 2006 National Census, the village's population was 959 in 314 households. The following census in 2011 counted 879 people in 299 households. The 2016 census measured the population of the village as 715 people in 254 households. It was the most populous village in its rural district.
