= Zir-e Bagh-e Shah =

Zir-e Bagh-e Shah زيرباغ شاه
- Village
- Location within Iran
- Coordinates: 31°37′00″N 54°08′00″E
- Country: Iran
- Province: Yazd
- County: Taft
- Bakhsh: Central
- Rural District: Shirkuh

Population (2006)
  - Total: 119
- Time zone: UTC+3:30 (IRST)
  - Summer (DST): UTC+4:30 (IRDT)

Zir-e Bagh-e Shah (Persian: زيرباغ شاه, also Romanized as Zīr-e Bāgh-e Shāh; also known as Behshīrī, Maḩalleh-ye Zīr-e Bāgh-e Shāh, Qoroq, and Shahīd Beheshtī) is a village in Shirkuh Rural District, in the Central District of Taft County, Yazd Province, Iran. At the 2006 census, its population was 119, in 53 families.
