= Khud-e Pain =

Khud-e Pain خودپايين
- Village
- Location within Iran
- Coordinates: 31°49′42″N 53°45′29″E
- Country: Iran
- Province: Yazd
- County: Taft
- Bakhsh: Central
- Rural District: Nasrabad

Population (2006)
  - Total: 74
- Time zone: UTC+3:30 (IRST)
  - Summer (DST): UTC+4:30 (IRDT)

Khud-e Pain (Persian: خودپايين, also Romanized as Khūd-e Pā’īn; also known as Khod-e-Pā’īn, Khūd-e Soflá, and Khūde Soflá) is a village in Nasrabad Rural District, in the Central District of Taft County, Yazd Province, Iran. At the 2006 census, its population was 74, in 26 families.
