= Mezang, Yazd =

Mezang مزنگ
- Village
- Location within Iran
- Coordinates: 31°41′00″N 53°53′00″E
- Country: Iran
- Province: Yazd
- County: Taft
- Bakhsh: Central
- Rural District: Aliabad

Population (2006)
  - Total: 73
- Time zone: UTC+3:30 (IRST)
  - Summer (DST): UTC+4:30 (IRDT)

Mezang (Persian: مزنگ; also known as Mazra‘eh Mazang and Mezank) is a village in Aliabad Rural District, in the Central District of Taft County, Yazd Province, Iran. At the 2006 census, its population was 73, in 24 families.
