= Shavvaz, Yazd =

Shavvaz شواز
- Village
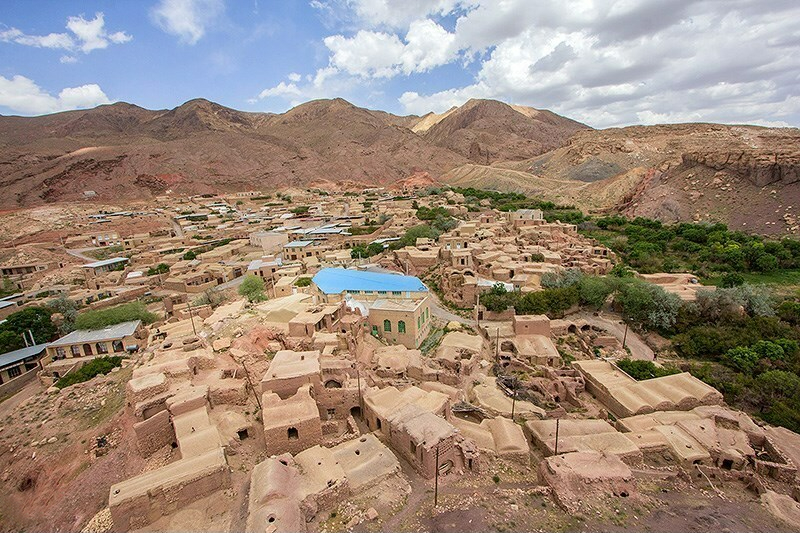

- Location within Iran
- Coordinates: 31°40′37″N 53°38′09″E
- Country: Iran
- Province: Yazd
- County: Taft
- Bakhsh: Central
- Rural District: Nasrabad

Population (2006)
  - Total: 157
- Time zone: UTC+3:30 (IRST)
  - Summer (DST): UTC+4:30 (IRDT)

Shavvaz (Persian: شواز, also Romanized as Shavvāz, and Shovāz, and Shavāz; also known as Shāh Āvaz and Shāh ‘Evaz) is a village in Nasrabad Rural District, in the Central District of Taft County, Yazd Province, Iran. At the 2006 census, its population was 157, in 70 families.
