= Amir Chakhmaq Complex =

Caravanserai and square complex in Yazd, Iran

- مجموعه میدان امیرچخماق
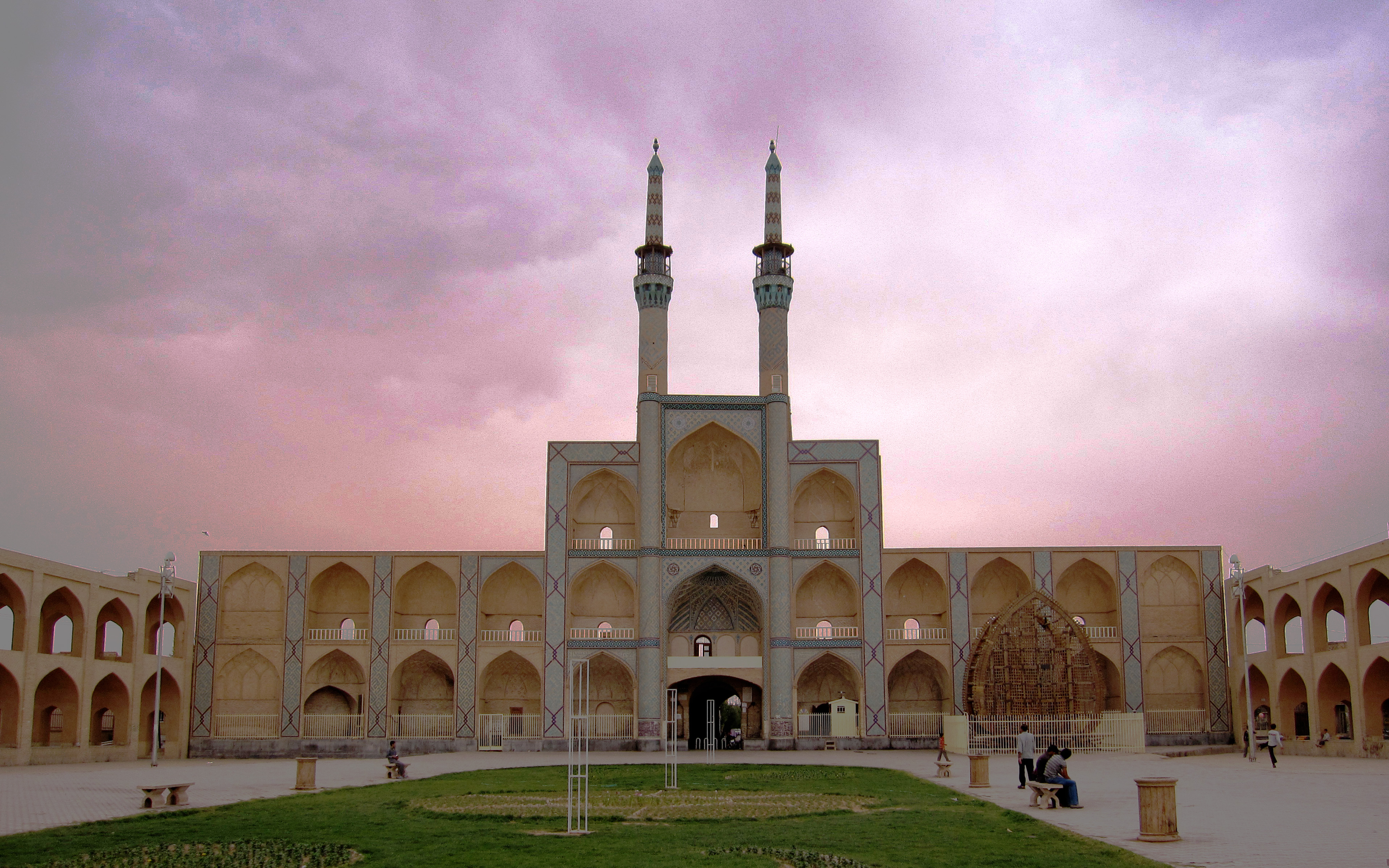
- The complex and courtyard at dusk

- Location of the caravanserai in Iran

Religion
- Affiliation: Shia Islam
- Ecclesiastical or organisational status: Caravanserai; Tekyeh; Bathhouse; Water well Confectionery

Location
- Location: Yazd, Yazd province
- Country: Iran
- Coordinates: 31°53′38″N 54°22′10″E

Architecture
- Type: Mosque architecture
- Style: Timurid
- Founder: Jalal ed-Din Amir Chakhmaq Shami
- Completed: Timurid Empire

Specifications
- Dome: One
- Minaret: Two

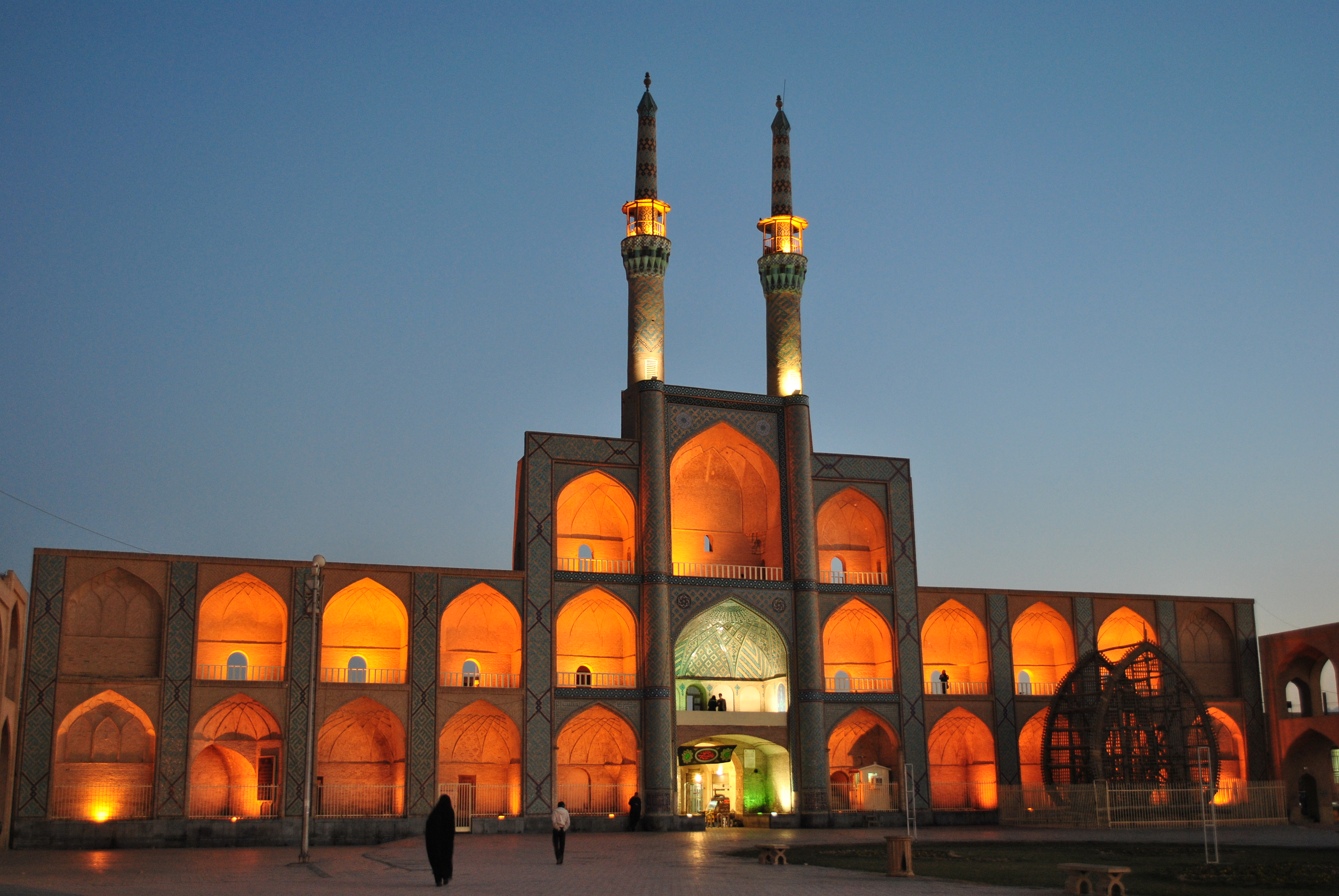
The Amir Chakhmaq Complex at night

The Amir Chakhmaq Complex (Persian: مجموعه میدان امیرچخماق, romanized: Majmūʿa Meydân Amir-Čaxmâq) (Note: Also Romanized as Chakhmaq, Chakmaq, Chakhmagh, Chakmak.) is a prominent structure in Yazd, Iran, noted for its symmetrical sunken alcoves. It is a mosque located on a square of the same name. It also contains a caravanserai, a tekyeh, a bathhouse, a cold water well, and a confectionery. At night, the building is lit up after twilight hours after sun set with orange lighting in the arched alcoves which makes it a spectacle. During the Iran–Iraq War and the Iraq wars with the United States and Afghanistan, many Iraqis and Afghanis came to inhabit the Amir Chakhmaq Square.

== Geography ==
The complex is located on a square of the same name, named after Amir Jalal ed-Din Chakhmaq, a governor of Yazd under the Timurid dynasty (15th–16th century CE). Separate living areas for Iraqis and Afghans are nearby. The complex is situated opposite of what was the Yazd Water Museum.

== The mosque ==
The Amir Chakhmaq Mosque (مسجد امیرچخماق), also known as the Dahouk Mosque (مسجد دهوک), is a Shi'ite mosque built on orders of Jalal ed-Din Amir Chakhmaq Shami, who was the governor of Yazd and a general of Shahrukh Mirza, and was completed in 1438, during the Timurid era. During the reign of Fath-Ali Shah Qajar, Hossein Attar added a part to its shabestan and restored some parts of the mosque.

== Architecture and fittings ==
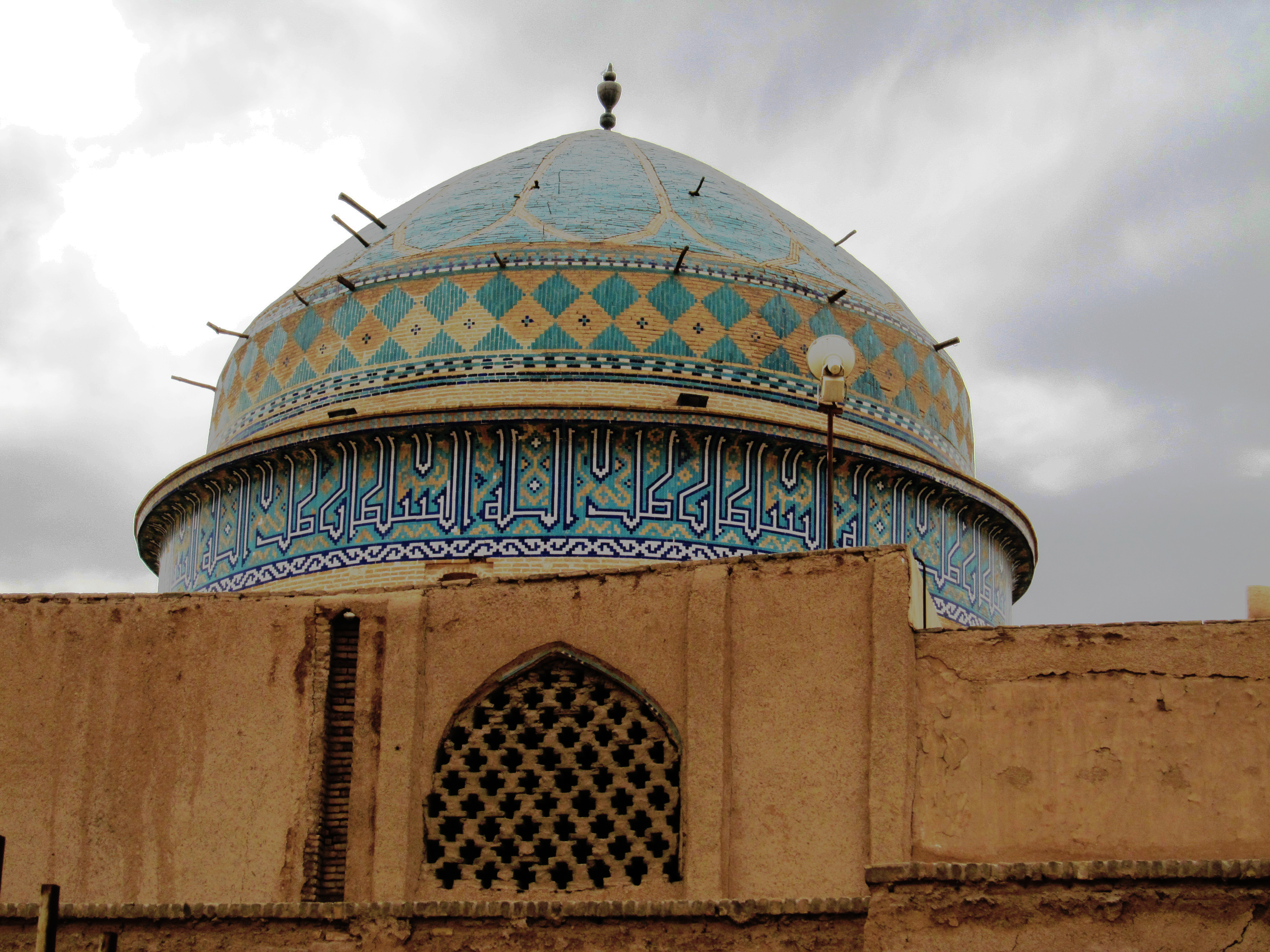
Dome of the Amir Chakhmaq Mosque

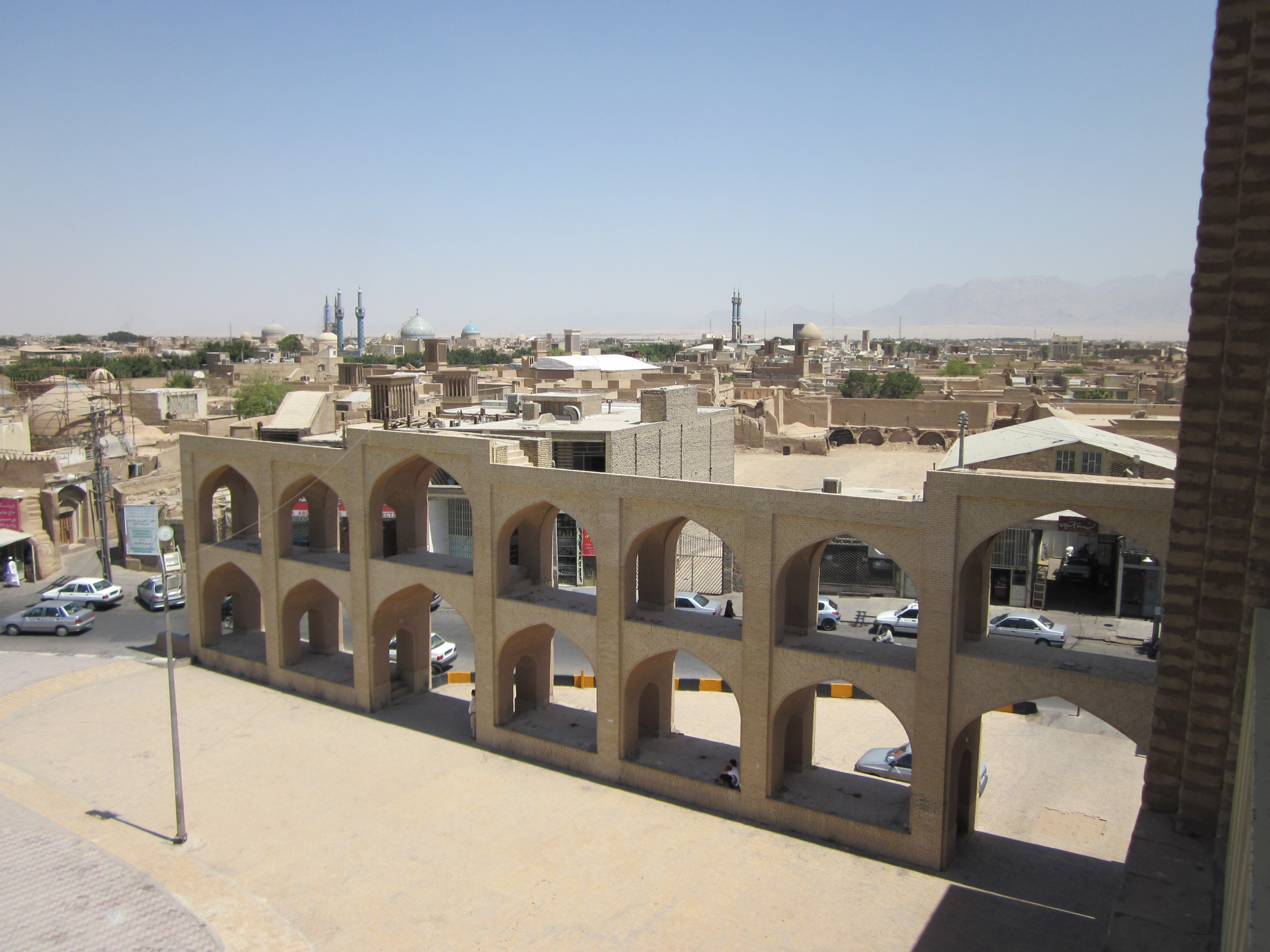

The prominent structure has a three-storey elaborate façade of symmetrical sunken arched alcoves. It is one of the largest hussainia in Iran. In the centre are two very tall minarets. The spiral staircase in one of the two minarets is said to create a feeling of claustrophobia, while it provides views of Yazd. At night, the building is lit up with orange lighting in the alcoves which makes it a spectacle. The complex also contains a caravanserai, a tekyeh, a bathhouse, a cold water well, and a confectionery. The bathhouse, in the front of the building is around 600 years old. Only the first floor above the ground level is accessible.

The complex includes the three-storey tekyeh which used to commemorate the death of Hussein ibn Ali. In the corner of the tekyeh, there is a nakhl, described as a "strong, wooden object with very large metal fixtures and studs". It was venerated during the Shiite commemoration festival of Ashura.

== History ==
Amir-Chaghmaq Square, according to Dr. Vahdat Zad, an architectural historian who has worked extensively on the spatial aspects of the square, was built in the 15th century by Jalal-al-Din Amir-Chakhmaq, the governor of Yazd in the Timurid era. This square was established on the north side of an important mosque called the Old Mosque, known today as Amir Chakhmaq mosque. According to Vahdat Zad, "the mosque was also founded by Amir-Chakhmaq between 1418 and 1438. The same year the mosque was inaugurated, Haj Qanbar Jahanshahi, who was the subsequent governor, constructed a bazaar and caravanserai at the sides of the square".

Many parts of the complex deteriorated until the 18th century in the Safavid era, when Bahador Khan Shams Yousef Meibodi renovated some parts and reconstructed the caravanserai in the same location. The complex again encountered erosion until the late 19th century.

Most of the changes in Amir-Chakhmagh Square were implemented during the modernisation period of Reza Shah. By completing Pahlavi Street in 1935, the northern part of the square, which connected it with the Bazaar, was demolished. It seems the caravanserai was demolished at the same time in order to develop the square in a more orderly rectangular shape.

Notably, the demolition of the square, as Vahdat Zad argues, "had nothing to do with the establishment of Soraya Street in 1943. It more likely occurred when Shah Street and Soraya Street were connected in the late 1950s. Nothing remained of the square then, except the Tekyeh. The municipality even tried to demolish the Tekyeh when one of the soffehs collapsed, but the archaeology office resisted strongly. Instead, they filled the two arcades at both sides in 1963 to prevent further drag".

== Gallery ==
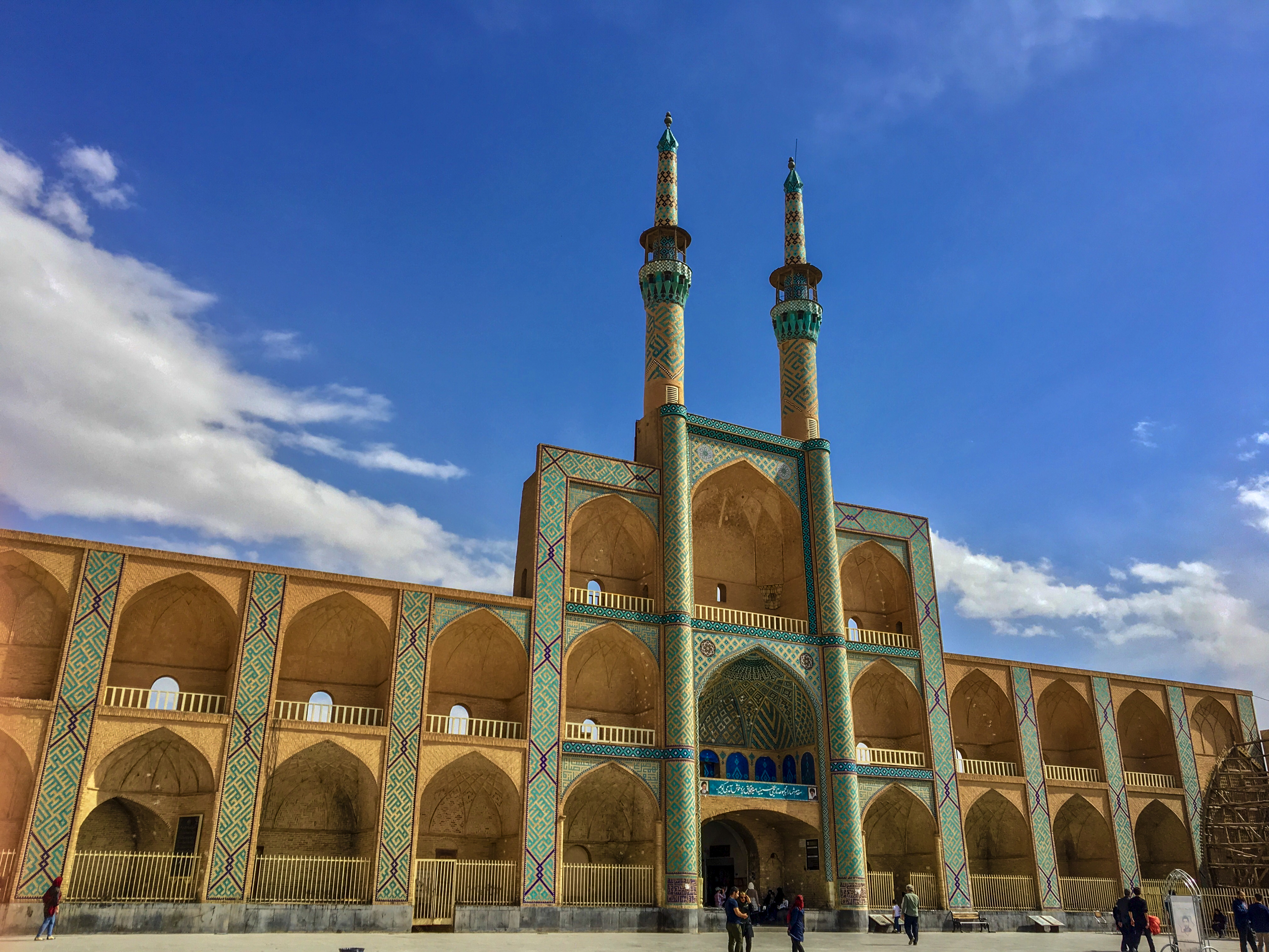

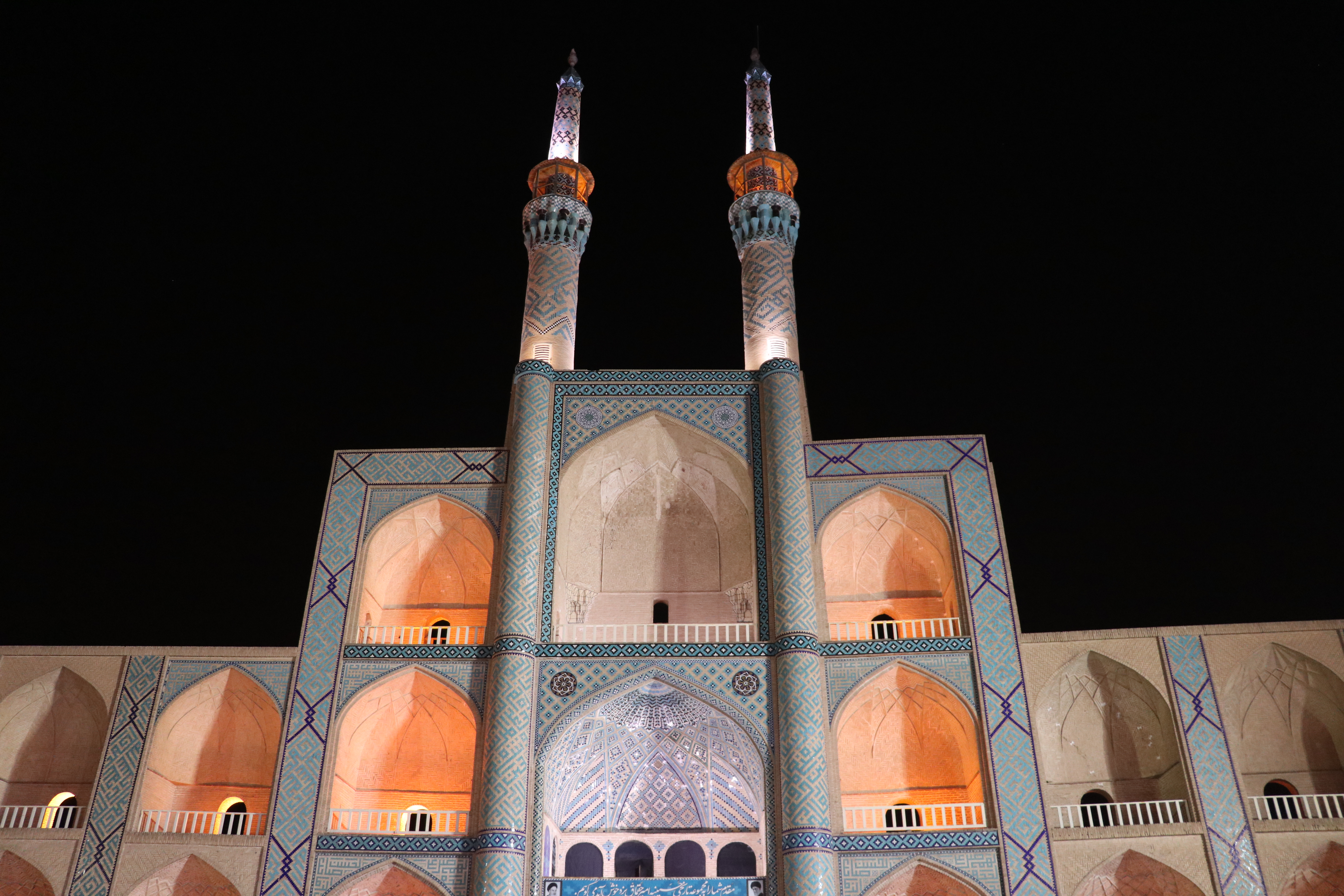
Amir Chakhmaq Complex at night

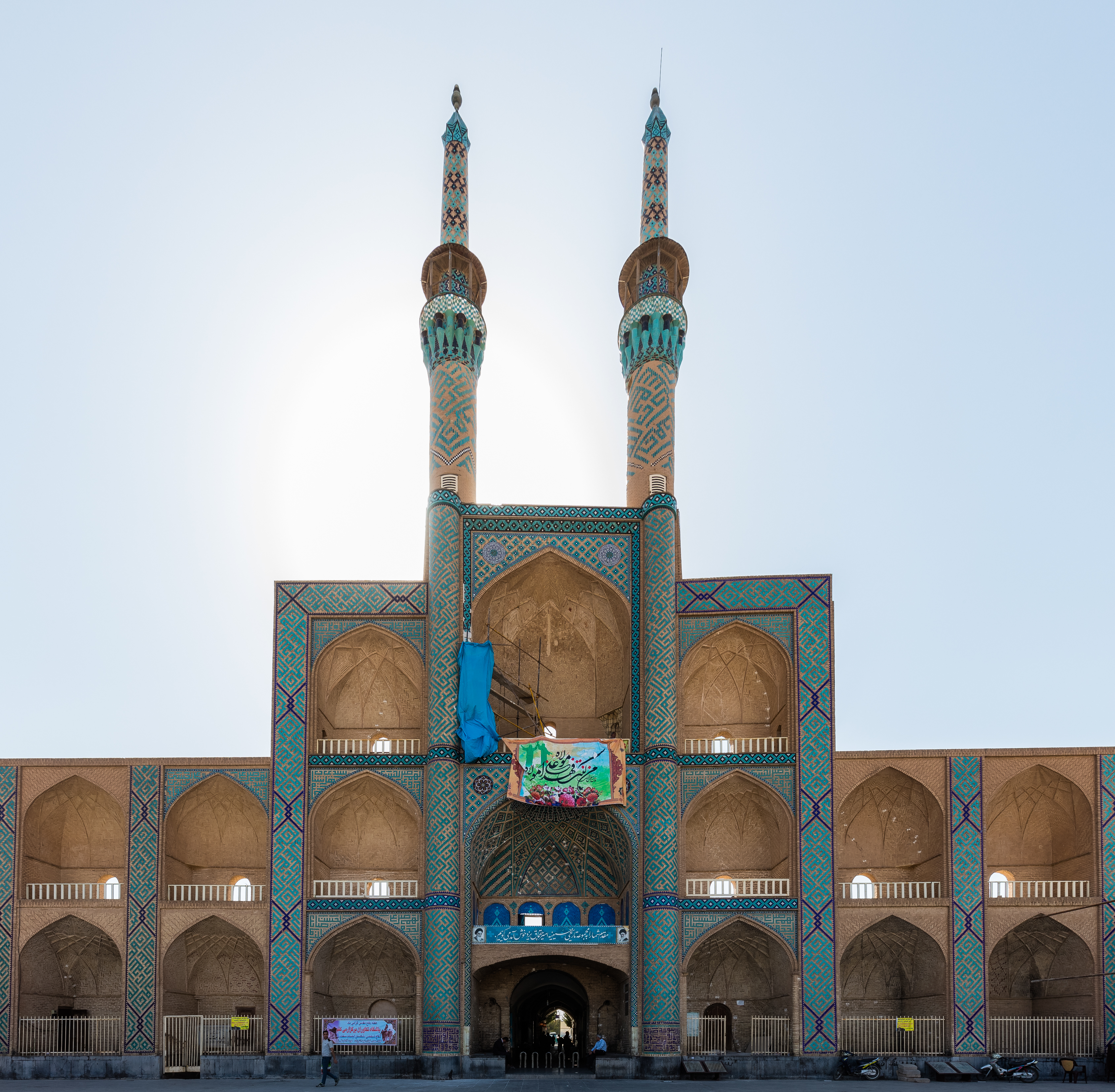

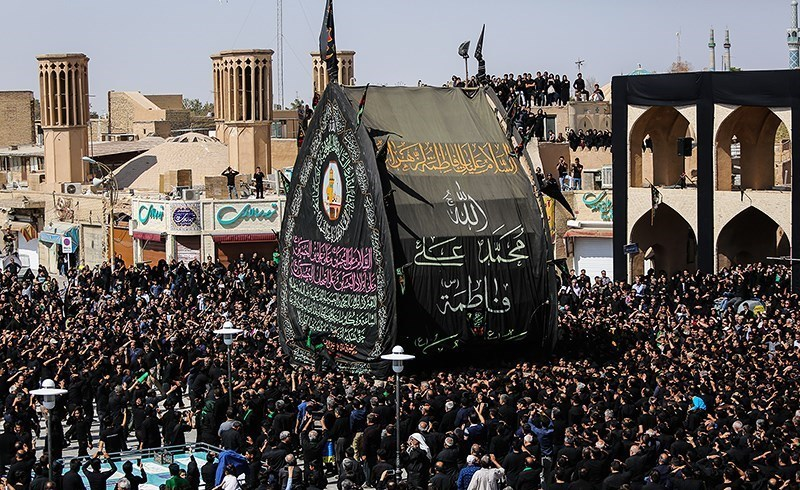
Nakhl Gardani in the complex in 2017

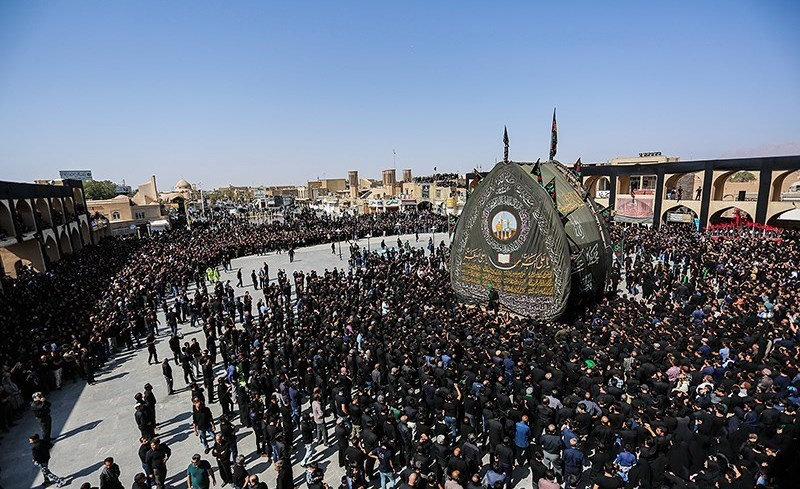
Nakhl Gardani in 2017

== See also ==
- Islam in Iran
- List of mosques in Iran
- Persian domes
