= Tezerjan =

Village in Yazd province, Iran

Tezerjan Persian: طزرجان
- Village
- Location within Iran
- Coordinates: 31°36′32″N 54°10′58″E
- Country: Iran
- Province: Yazd
- County: Taft
- District: Central
- Rural District: Shirkuh

Population (2016)
  - Total: 355
- Time zone: UTC+3:30 (IRST)

Tezerjan (Persian: طزرجان) (Note: Also romanized as Ţezerjān and Tezerjān; also known as Tazarjūn, Ţerezjān, Ţerzejān, and Tizīnjūn) is a village in, and the capital of, Shirkuh Rural District of the Central District of Taft County, Yazd province, Iran.

== Demographics ==
=== Population ===
At the time of the 2006 National Census, the village's population was 506 in 166 households. The following census in 2011 counted 393 people in 178 households. The 2016 census measured the population of the village as 355 people in 129 households. It was the most populous village in its rural district.
