= Tasu'a =

Shia holiday

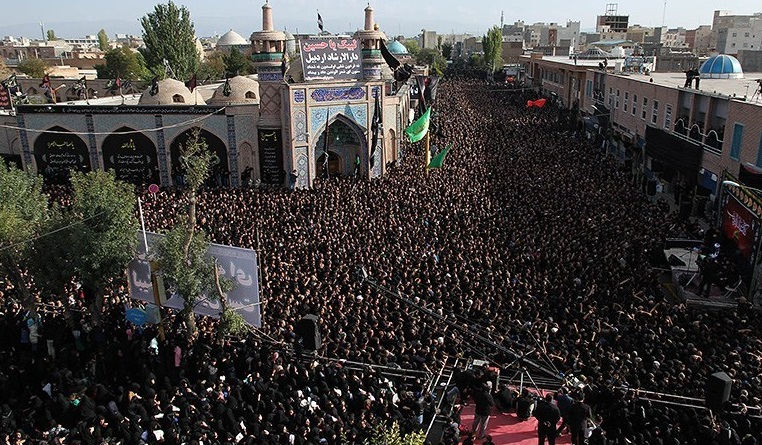
- Tasu'a mourning procession in Ardabil, Iran
- Observed by: Shia Muslims
- Type: Islamic
- Significance: Mourning the death of Husayn ibn Ali, grandson of the Islamic prophet Muhammad and the third Shia imam
- Observances: Mourning rituals
- Date: 9 Muharram
- Frequency: Annual (Islamic calendar)

Tasu'a (Arabic: تاسوعاء, romanized: Tāsūʿāʾ) is the ninth day of Muharram, the first month of the Islamic calendar. Tasu'a is followed by Ashura, tenth of Muharram, which marks the death of Husayn ibn Ali, grandson of the Islamic prophet Muhammad and the third Shia Imam. Husayn was brutally killed along with many members of his family and companions by the Umayyad caliph Yazid in the Battle of Karbala on Ashura 61 AH (680 CE). His suffering and martyrdom became a symbol of sacrifice in the struggle for right against wrong, and for justice and truth against injustice and falsehood. He is a universal, borderless, interfaith and meta-religion symbol. Husayn and his companions are widely regarded as martyrs by all Muslims.

The battle in Karbala was to take place on Tasu'a but was delayed for a day. Husayn used this window to urge his followers to leave him and save their lives, which nearly all of them refused. The Umayyad army also offered safe passage to some close relatives of Husayn, notably his half-brother Abbas ibn Ali, which they also refused. By most accounts, Husayn and his men spent their last night—the night of Tasu'a—in prayer.

== Significance in Shia Islam ==
Tasu'a is the ninth day of Muharram, the first month of the Islamic calendar, a month in which fighting has been forbidden since before the advent of Islam. Tasu'a is followed by Ashura, tenth of Muharram, which marks the death of Husayn ibn Ali, grandson of the Islamic prophet Muhammad and the third Shia imam. Husayn was killed, alongside most of his male relatives and his small retinue, on 10 Muharram 61 AH (10 October 680 CE) in the Battle of Karbala against the army of the Umayyad caliph Yazid ibn Mu'awiya (r. 680–683), having been surrounded for some days and deprived of the drinking water of the nearby Euphrates river. After the battle, the women and children in Husayn's camp were taken prisoner and marched to the Umayyad capital Damascus in Syria. The battle followed failed negotiations and Husayn's refusal to pledge his allegiance to Yazid, who is often portrayed by Muslim historians as impious and immoral. The fight took place in the desert land of Karbala, en route to the nearby Kufa, whose residents had invited Husayn to lead them against Yazid.

In Shia Islam, Karbala symbolizes the eternal struggle between good and evil, the pinnacle of self-sacrifice, and the ultimate sabotage of Muhammad's prophetic mission. Historically, the event served to crystallize the Shia community into a distinct sect and remains an integral part of their religious identity to date. The first ten days of Muharram, including Tasu'a and Ashura, are days of mourning for Shia Muslims. On the one hand, Shia mourners share in the pain of Husayn and hope to benefit from his intercession on the Day of Judgement. On the other, the Shia minority views mourning for Husayn as an act of protest against oppression, a struggle for God (jihad), and as such an act of worship.

== Events of Tasu'a ==
Following failed negotiations, the Umayyad army attacked the camp of Husayn in the afternoon of Tasu'a. As the Umayyad army approached, however, Husayn dispatched his half-brother Abbas ibn Ali and some companions, who convinced the enemy commander Umar ibn Sa'd (d. 686) to delay the confrontation until the following day. Husayn then beseeched his followers in a speech to leave and not risk their lives, after which Abbas was the first to renew his support. Nearly all those present stayed with Husayn until the end. By most accounts, Husayn and his men spent that night praying and reading the Quran, the central religious text of Islam. On this night, Husayn's sister Zaynab is said to have reminded her half-brother Abbas of their father's wish for the latter to be the reserves of Karbala, and to be to Husayn as Ali was to Muhammad. This Abbas confirmed and swore to do. There is a report by the Shia historian Ibn Tawus (d. 1266) that Abbas was killed on Tasu'a in a failed sally to bring water for the thirsty camp. Most sources, however, place his death on Ashura.

The Umayyad officer Shamir ibn Dhi al-Jawshan had earlier acquired safe passage for Abbas ibn Ali and his three (full) brothers from Ibn Ziyad (d. 686), the Umayyad governor of Kufa. Shamir did so perhaps because he was also a member of the Banu Kilab tribe, to which Abbas' mother belonged. Ibn Ziyad's letter of protection was then sent to Abbas and his brothers, who refused it. Shamir extended the same offer on Tasu'a, but Abbas and his brothers remained defiant.

== Mourning rituals ==
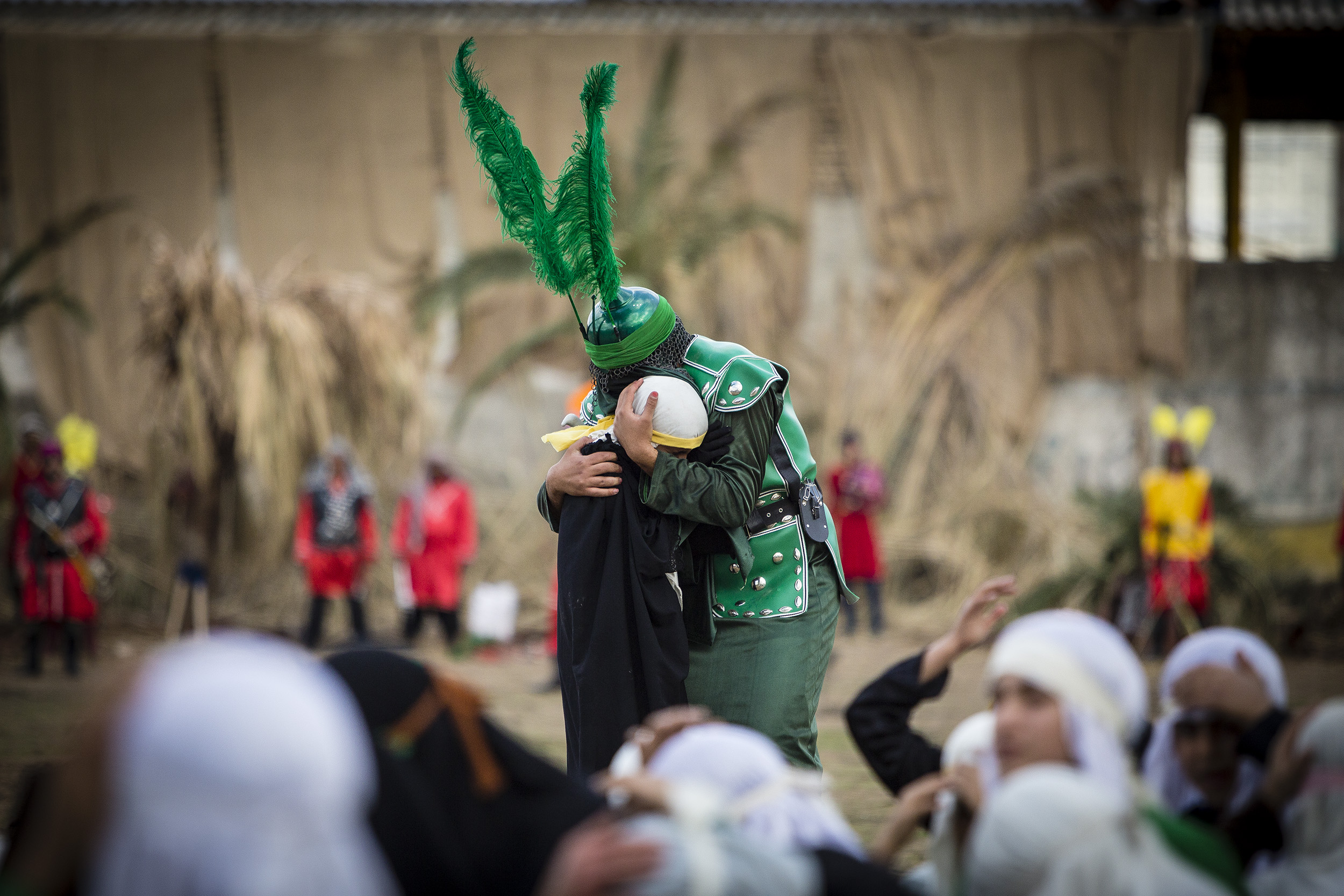
Shia passion play (ta'ziya) in Iran

In addition to pilgrimage to the shrine of Husayn, located in Karbala, Iraq, Shia Muslims annually commemorate the events of Karbala throughout the months of Muharram and Safar. Most rituals take place during the first ten days of Muharram, culminating on Ashura with processions in major Shia cities. The main component of ritual ceremonies (majalis, sing. majlis) is the narration of the stories of Karbala (rawza-khwani, qiraya), and the recitation of rhythmic elegies and dirges (nawha, niyaha, marsia-khwani), all intended to raise the sympathy of audience and move them to tears. A majlis often takes place in a dedicated building or structure, known variously as Husayniya, takiya, imambarah, or azakhana. Another component of mourning gatherings is the self-flagellation of participants to the rhythm of Karbala elegies. Rooted in ancient Arab practices, mild forms of self-flagellation, striking one's face and chest in grief (latm, sina-zani, matam), are common today in Shia communities. But there are also extreme forms of self-flagellation (tatbir, tiq-zani, qama-zani), in which the participants strike themselves, usually on the forehead or back, with knives, swords, or chains to which razor blades are attached. Banned in Iran and the Shia communities of Lebanon since the mid-90s, instrumental self-flagellation has been condemned by many Shia clerics, and it remains an often controversial practice among the Shia.

Another mourning ritual is the dramatic reenactment of Karbala narratives (ta'ziyeh or shabih-khani), practiced today in Iran, in the western Gulf shore, and in Lebanon. On Tasu'a, often such plays are dedicated to Abbas ibn Ali, Husayn's half-brother and his standard-bearer in the Battle of Karbala. During Muharram, especially on Ashura, processions of mourners (dasta, mawkib) march the streets, chanting dirges and elegies, sometimes accompanied by self-flagellation. For instance, in Najaf, Iraq, mourners march in the evening of Tasu'a toward the shrine of Ali ibn Abi Talib, the first Shia imam, while carrying decorative torches. Depending on the region, processions also carry symbolic objects, such as alam (lit. 'flag'), nakhl (lit. 'date palm'), ta'ziya, and tadjah. Alam represents the ensign of Husayn in Karbala, while the last three objects symbolize his bier or tomb.

Mourning rituals on Tasu'a

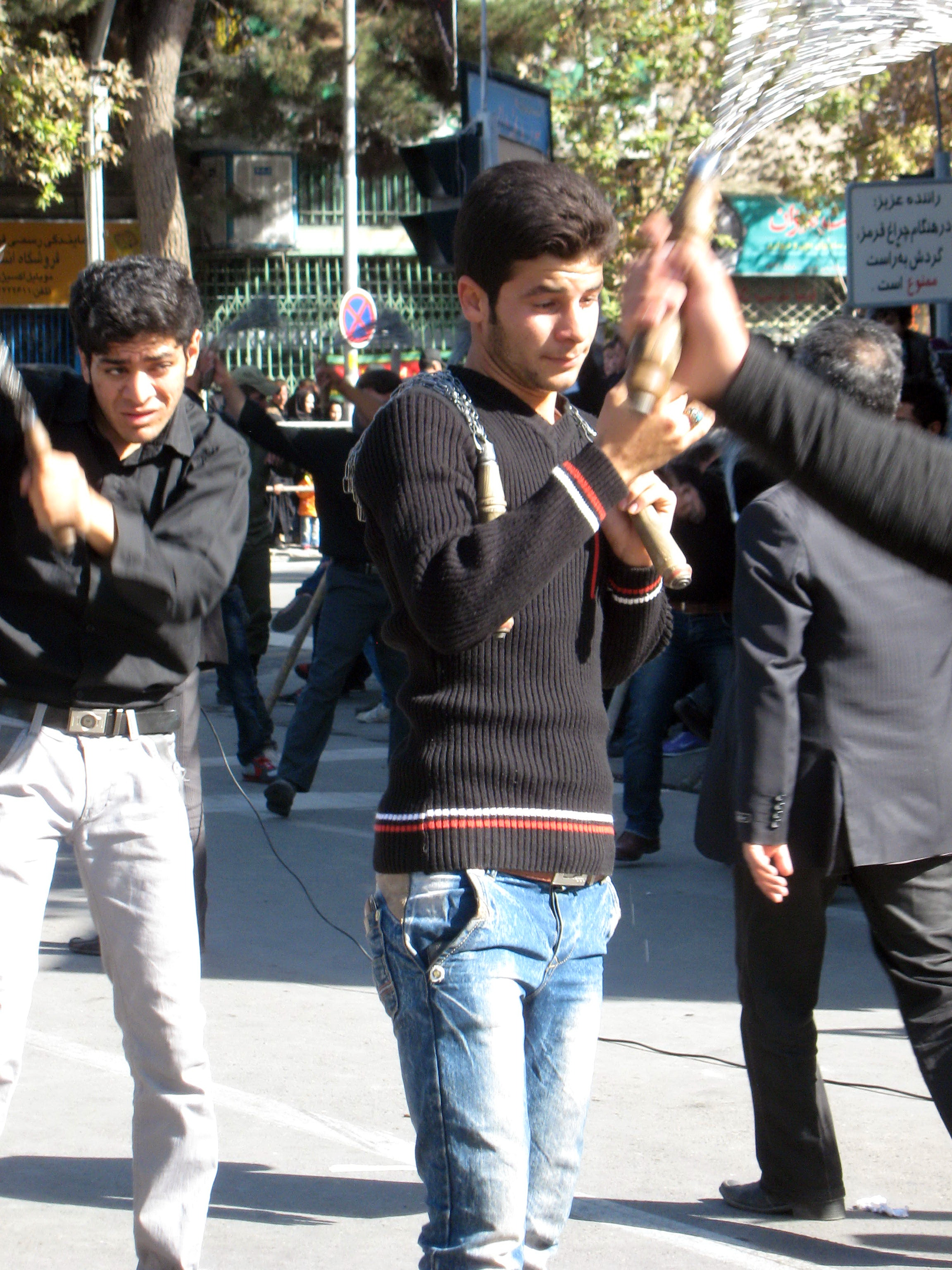

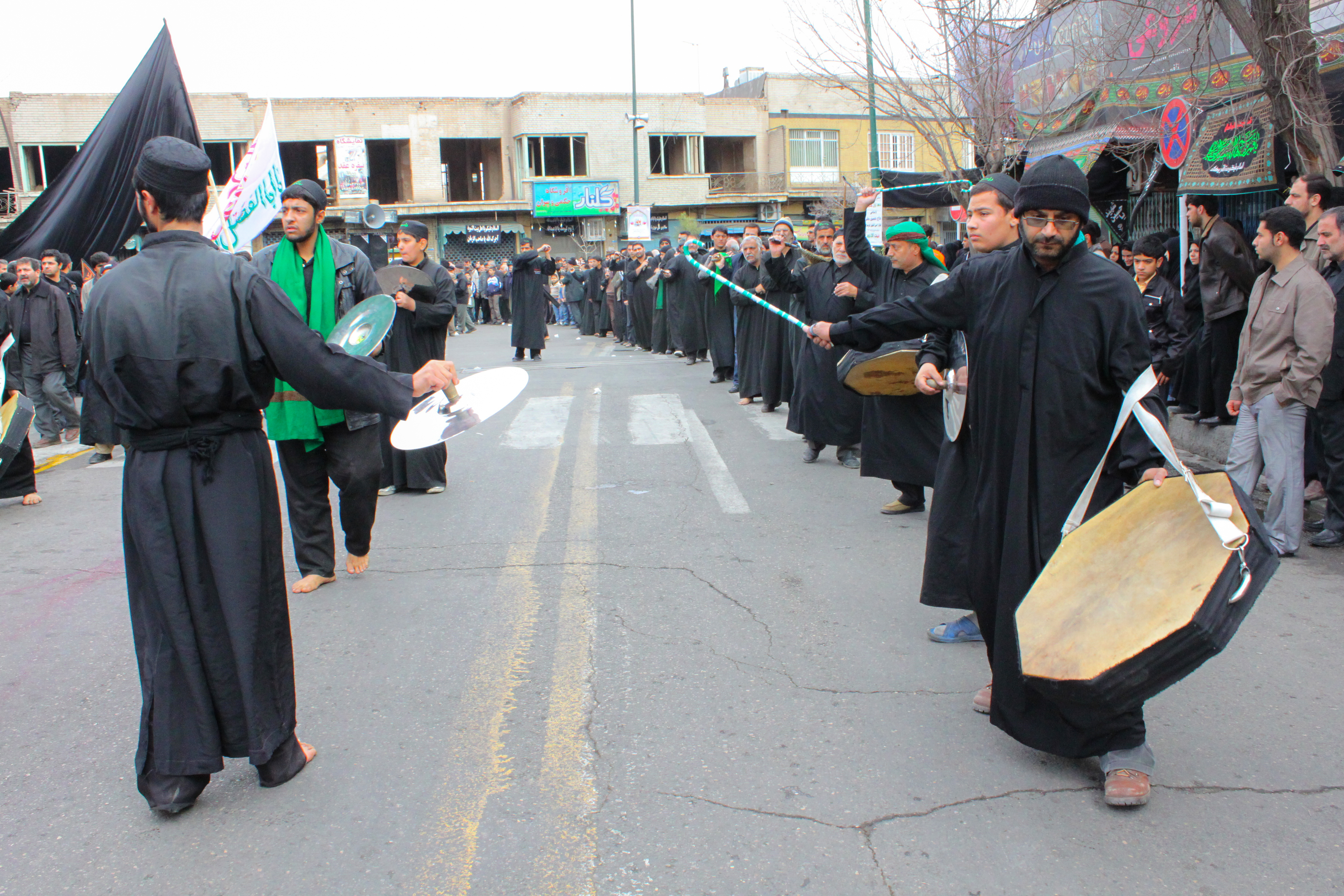

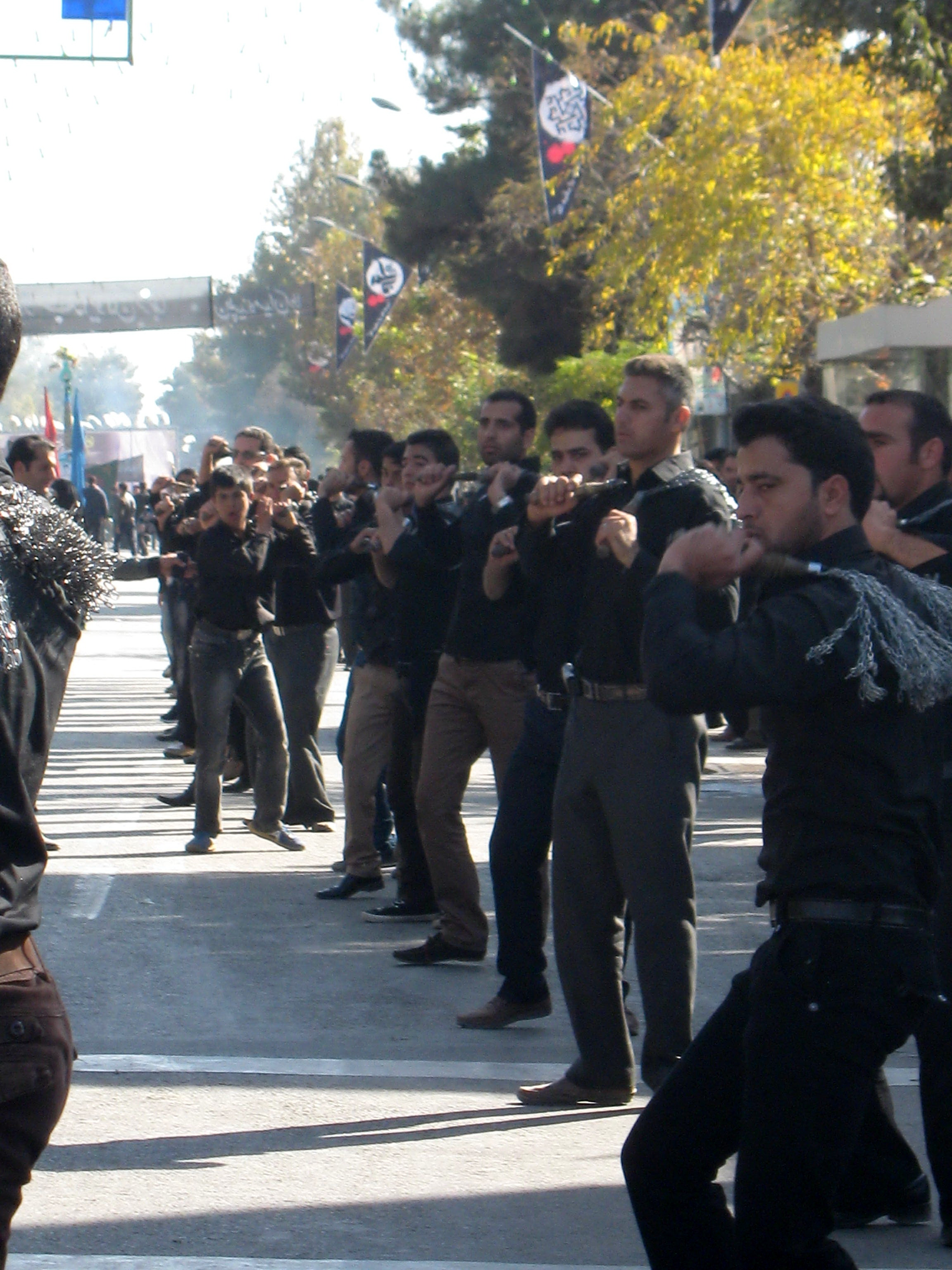

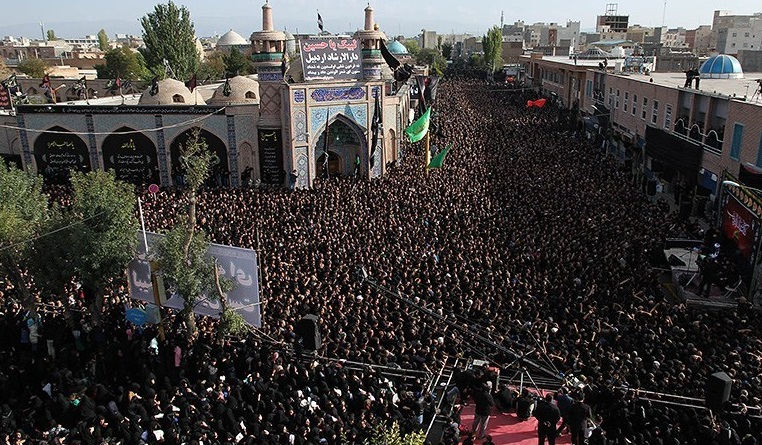

== See also ==
- Mourning of Muharram
- Arba'een
- Ashura
- Battle of Karbala
