= Khud-e Bala =

Khud-e Bala خودبالا
- Village
- Location within Iran
- Coordinates: 31°49′09″N 53°45′37″E
- Country: Iran
- Province: Yazd
- County: Taft
- Bakhsh: Central
- Rural District: Nasrabad

Population (2006)
  - Total: 38
- Time zone: UTC+3:30 (IRST)
  - Summer (DST): UTC+4:30 (IRDT)

Khud-e Bala (Persian: خودبالا, also Romanized as Khūd-e Bālā; also known as Khūd-e Mīān) is a village in Nasrabad Rural District, in the Central District of Taft County, Yazd Province, Iran. At the 2006 census, its population was 38, in 10 families.
