= Nasrabad, Taft =

Village in Yazd province, Iran

Nasrabad Persian: نصراباد
- Village
- Location within Iran
- Coordinates: 31°45′39″N 53°51′40″E
- Country: Iran
- Province: Yazd
- County: Taft
- District: Central
- Rural District: Nasrabad

Population (2016)
  - Total: 1,898
- Time zone: UTC+3:30 (IRST)

Nasrabad (Persian: نصراباد) (Note: Also romanized as Naşrābād; also known as Nasr Abad Pishkooh, Nasrābād-e Pīshkūh, and Naşrābād-e Pīshkūh) is a village in, and the capital of, Nasrabad Rural District of the Central District of Taft County, Yazd province, Iran.

== Demographics ==
=== Population ===
At the time of the 2006 National Census, the village's population was 1,775 in 551 households. The following census in 2011 counted 2,715 people in 835 households. The 2016 census measured the population of the village as 1,898 people in 619 households. It was the most populous village in its rural district.
