= Galuyak-e Olya =

Galuyak-e Olya گلويك عليا
- Village
- Location within Iran
- Coordinates: 31°44′56″N 53°41′11″E
- Country: Iran
- Province: Yazd
- County: Taft
- Bakhsh: Central
- Rural District: Nasrabad

Population (2006)
  - Total: 72
- Time zone: UTC+3:30 (IRST)
  - Summer (DST): UTC+4:30 (IRDT)

Galuyak-e Olya (Persian: گلويك عليا, also Romanized as Galūyak-e ‘Olyā; also known as Galooyek, Galūyak, Galūyak-e Bālā, and Galūyok) is a village in Nasrabad Rural District, in the Central District of Taft County, Yazd Province, Iran.

== Background ==
At the 2006 census, its population was 72, with 27 families.
