= Khalilabad, Taft =

Khalilabad خليل اباد
- Village
- Location within Iran
- Coordinates: 31°47′04″N 54°13′27″E
- Country: Iran
- Province: Yazd
- County: Taft
- Bakhsh: Central
- Rural District: Pishkuh

Population (2006)
  - Total: 163
- Time zone: UTC+3:30 (IRST)
  - Summer (DST): UTC+4:30 (IRDT)

Khalilabad (Persian: خليل اباد, also Romanized as Khalīlābād) is a village in Pishkuh Rural District, in the Central District of Taft County, Yazd Province, Iran. At the 2006 census, its population was 163, in 44 families.
