= Galuyak-e Sofla =

Galuyak-e Sofla گلويك سفلي
- Village
- Location within Iran
- Coordinates: 31°43′03″N 53°40′23″E
- Country: Iran
- Province: Yazd
- County: Taft
- Bakhsh: Central
- Rural District: Nasrabad

Population (2006)
  - Total: 15
- Time zone: UTC+3:30 (IRST)
  - Summer (DST): UTC+4:30 (IRDT)

Galuyak-e Sofla (Persian: گلويك سفلي, also Romanized as Galūyak-e Soflá; also known as Galūyak and Gelūyok-e Pā’īn) is a village in Nasrabad Rural District, in the Central District of Taft County, Yazd Province, Iran. At the 2006 census, its population was 15, in 6 families.
