= Shavvaz Castle =

Shavvaz castle
- قلعه شواز
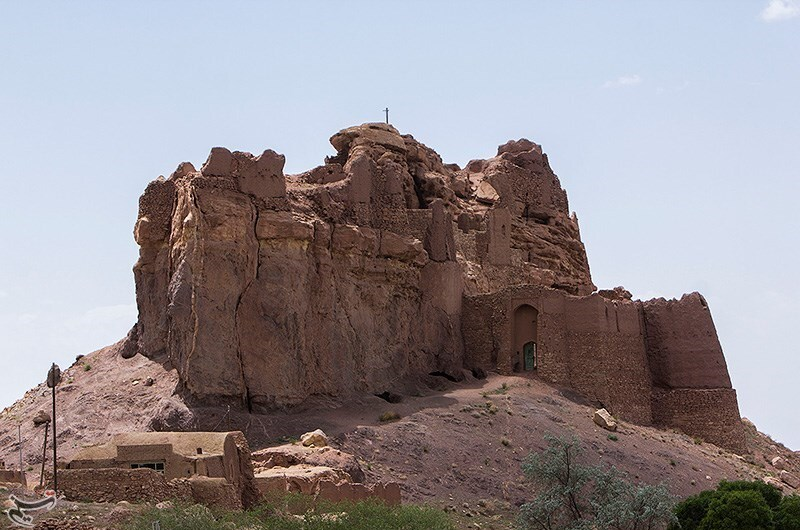
- Interactive map of the Shavvaz castle area

General information
- Type: Castle
- Architectural style: Iranian
- Location: Shavvaz, Iran

Shavvaz castle is a castle in Shavvaz, Iran, and is one of the attractions of Yazd Province. This castle was built by the Sasanian Empire.
