= Nakhl Gardani =

Shia religious ritual

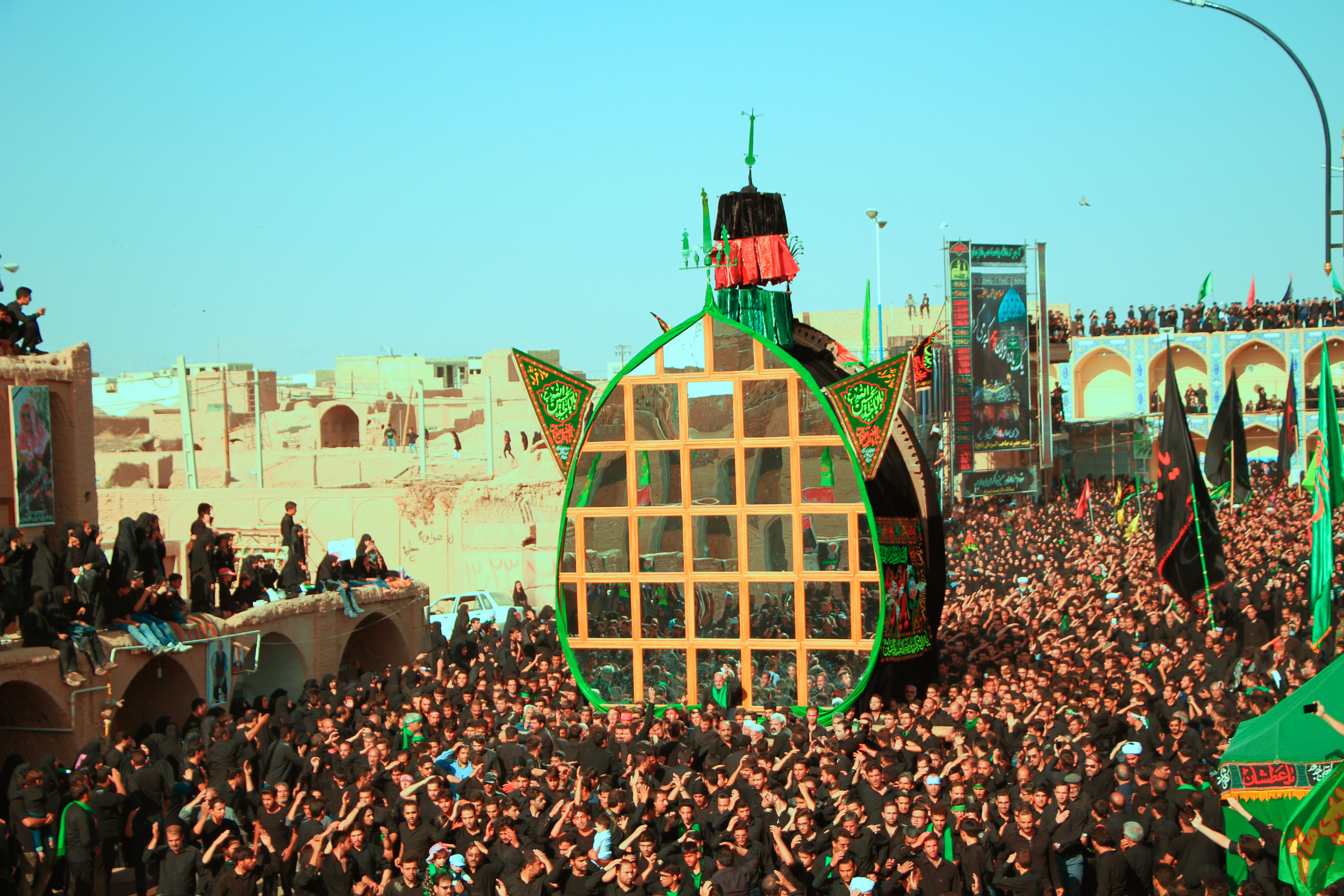
- Nakhl Gardani in Zarch
- Status: active
- Genre: religious mourning
- Dates: Ashura, 10th Muharram
- Frequency: Annually
- Country: Iran
- Participants: Shia Muslims

Nakhl Gardani (Persian: نخل گردانی, Persian pronunciation: [næxl ɡærdɑːniː]) or Nakhl Bardari is a Shia religious ritual carried out on the day of Ashura for commemorating the death of Husayn ibn Ali, the grandson of the Islamic prophet Moḥammad and third Shia Imam. Nakhl is a wooden structure used as a symbolic representation of the Imam's coffin and Nakhl Gardani is the act of carrying the Nakhl from one place to another, resembling an Imam's funeral.

The ritual is carried out in many cities of Iran among them Yazd, Taft, Kashan and Shahroud.

== Nakhl ==
Nakhl (date palm) is a woody structure similar to a cypress tree in shape, symbolizing Husayn ibn Ali's coffin. Dehkhoda defines Nakhl as "a big, tall bier (coffin) to which are attached daggers, swords, luxurious fabrics, and mirrors." Nakhls are constructed in various sizes, from a simple ones carried by two persons, to huge structures "supported by hundreds of men". According to Parviz Tanavoli, an Iranian sculptor, Nakhl is a freestanding sculpture.

The structure is called Nakhl since it is widely believed that Husayn ibn Ali's body was moved to the shade of a palm tree, after his death, or because his body was carried using a coffin made of branches of palm tree, "the only material available in Karbala" at that time.

=== Yazd's Nakhl ===
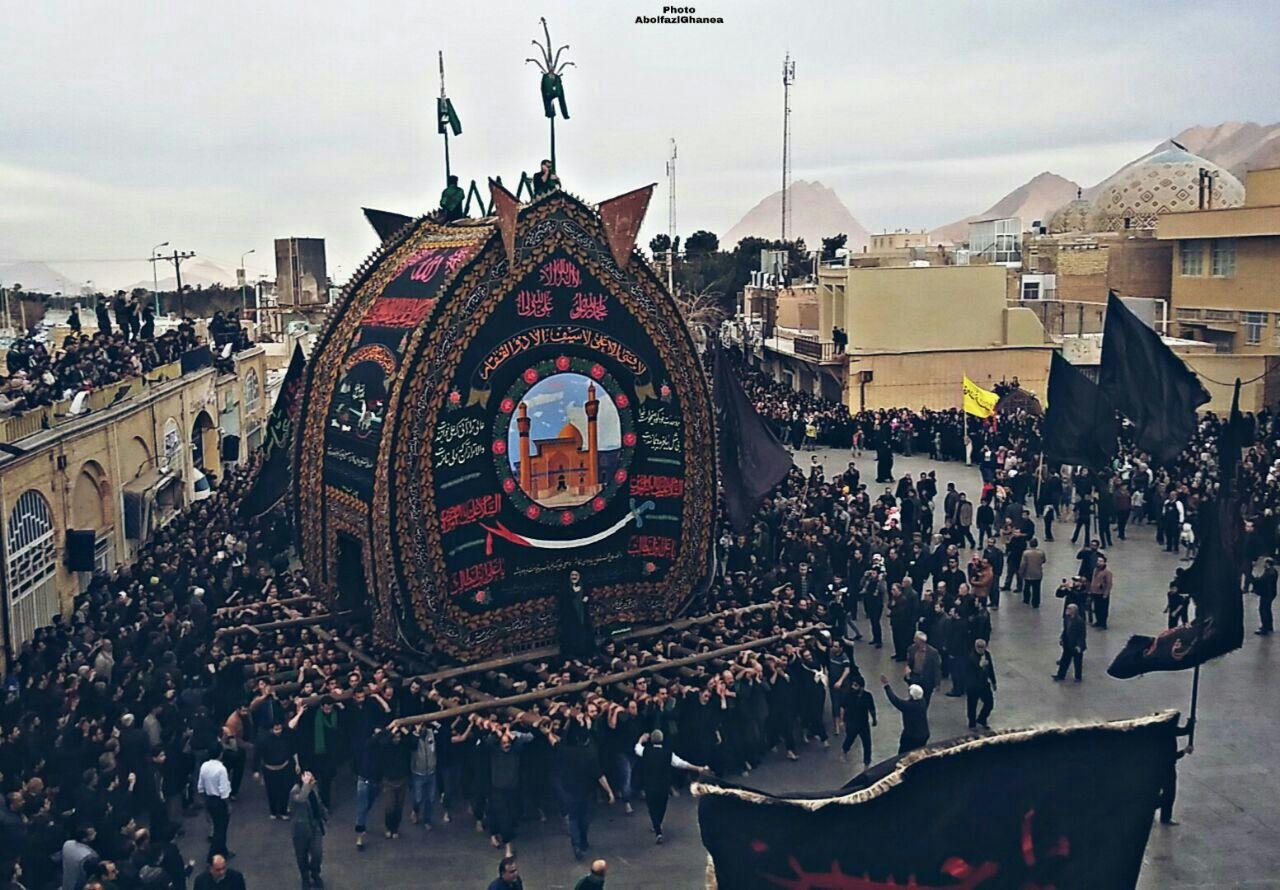
Nakhl Gardani in Taft

As a "symbol of social unity for a town, village, or district," many Nakhls and their associated rituals are seen in Yazd Province, located near the Kavir Desert, with every village having its own Nakhl. Nakhl is often referred to as Naql, i.e. "to convey carry and transfer," in Yazd and neighboring towns and villages. Yazd is described as "Iran’s museum of mourning tools" by Jalal Al-e-Ahmad, and is the home to the largest Nakhl, which needs to be carried by "several hundred men". The 8.5 meters high structure, constructed in 1879, stands in Amir Chakhmaq square of Yazd city and is decayed and no longer used because of the safety concerns. In Ashura, Nakhl Gardani is held in different parts of Yazd. The most crowded and beautiful ones is held in Taft city.

=== Ritual ===
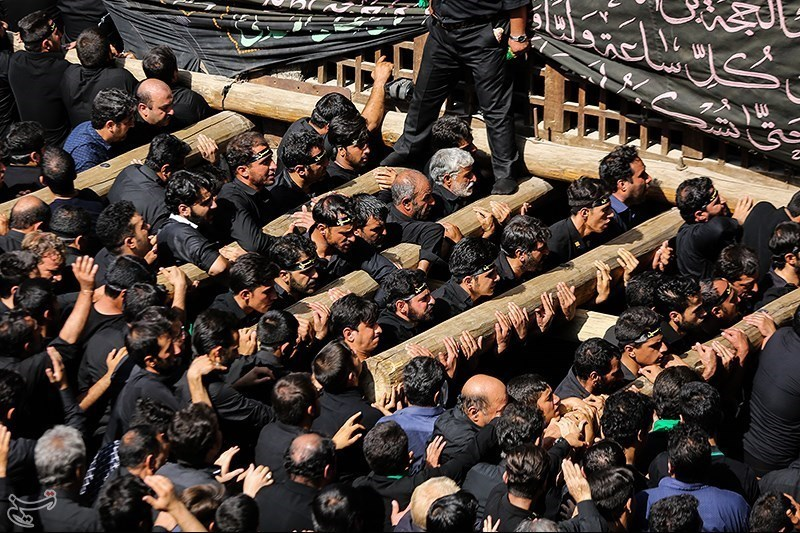
Mourners carrying the Nakhl by holding the wooden columns

Nakh-Gardani is the act of carrying Nakhl, sometimes by "several strong men", on the Day of Ashura, as if it is Imam Husayn's coffin. The ritual, historically dating back to pre-Safavids (almost 450 years ago), is carried out at various places in Iran. People carrying the Nakhl on their shoulders are guided by the people standing on the Nakhl.

The ritual is so common in Iran that in most parts of the country, either people have the Nakhl in their community or at least they know about it.

== Gallery ==
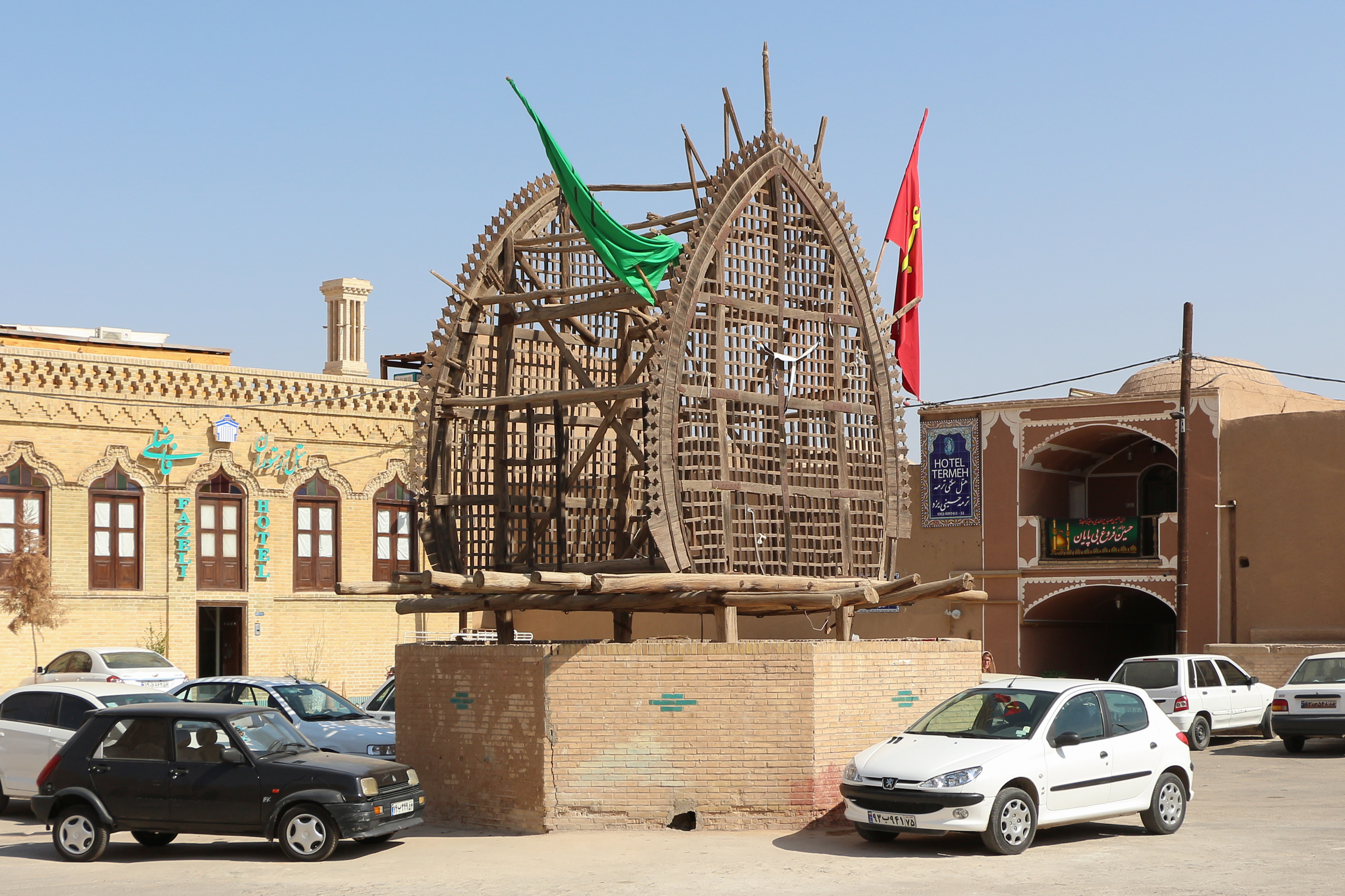
A Nakhl in Yazd

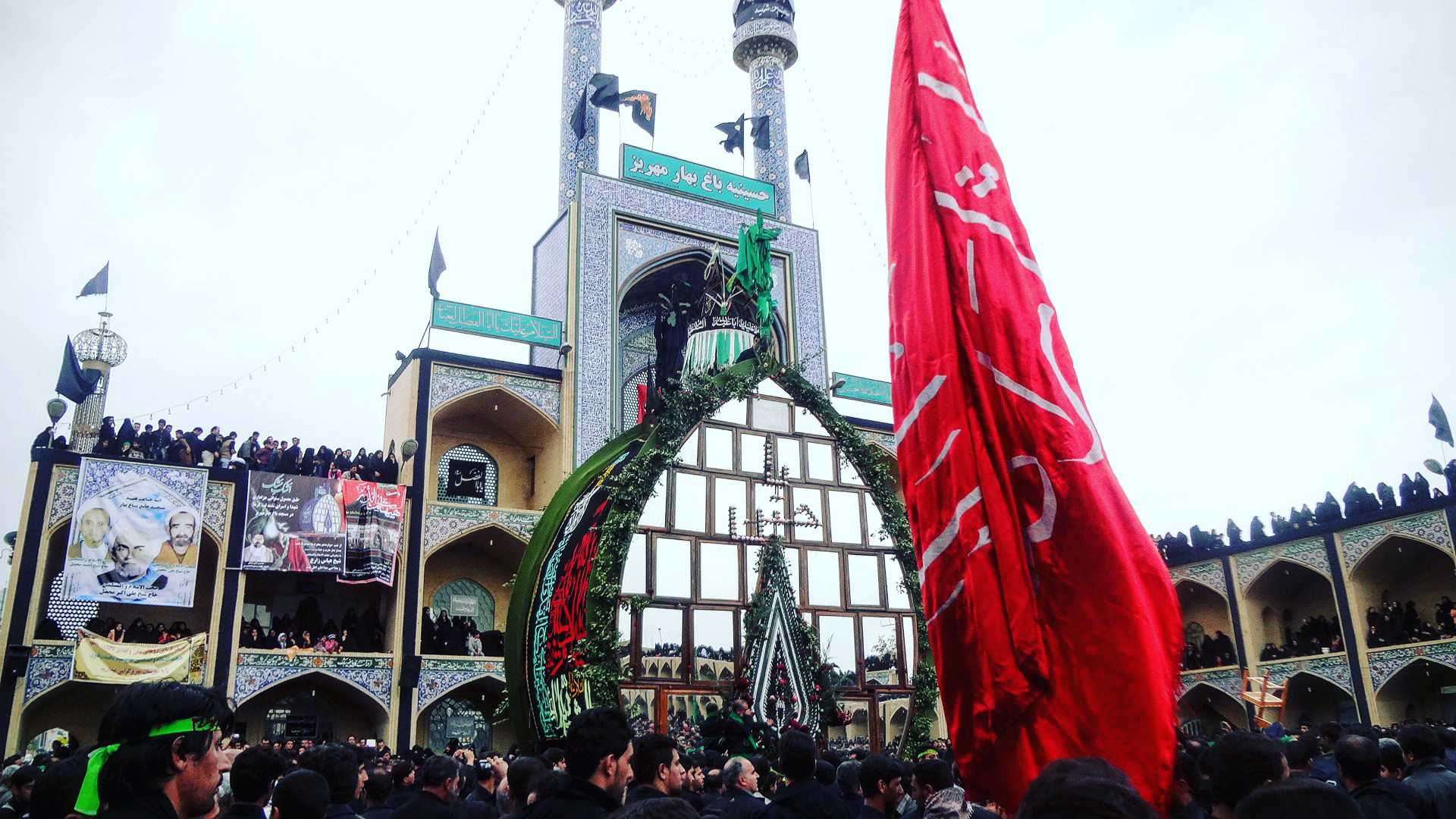
Nakhl Gardani in Mehriz, Yazd.

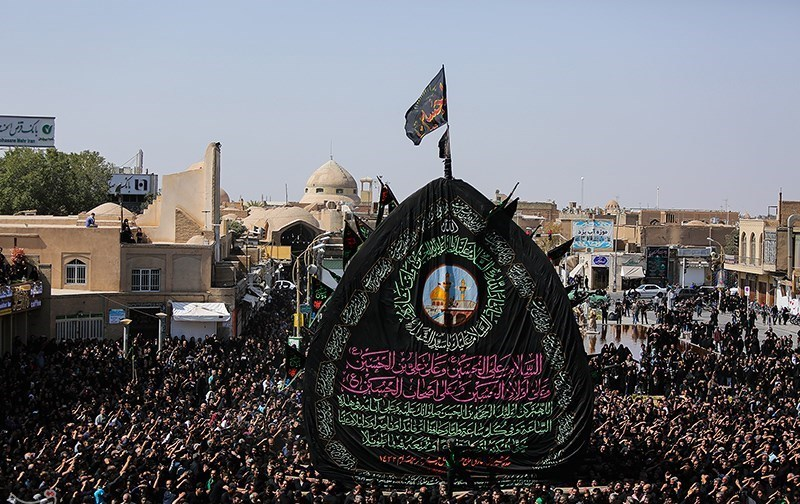
Nakhl Gardani in Amir Chakhmaq Complex, Yazd, 2017.

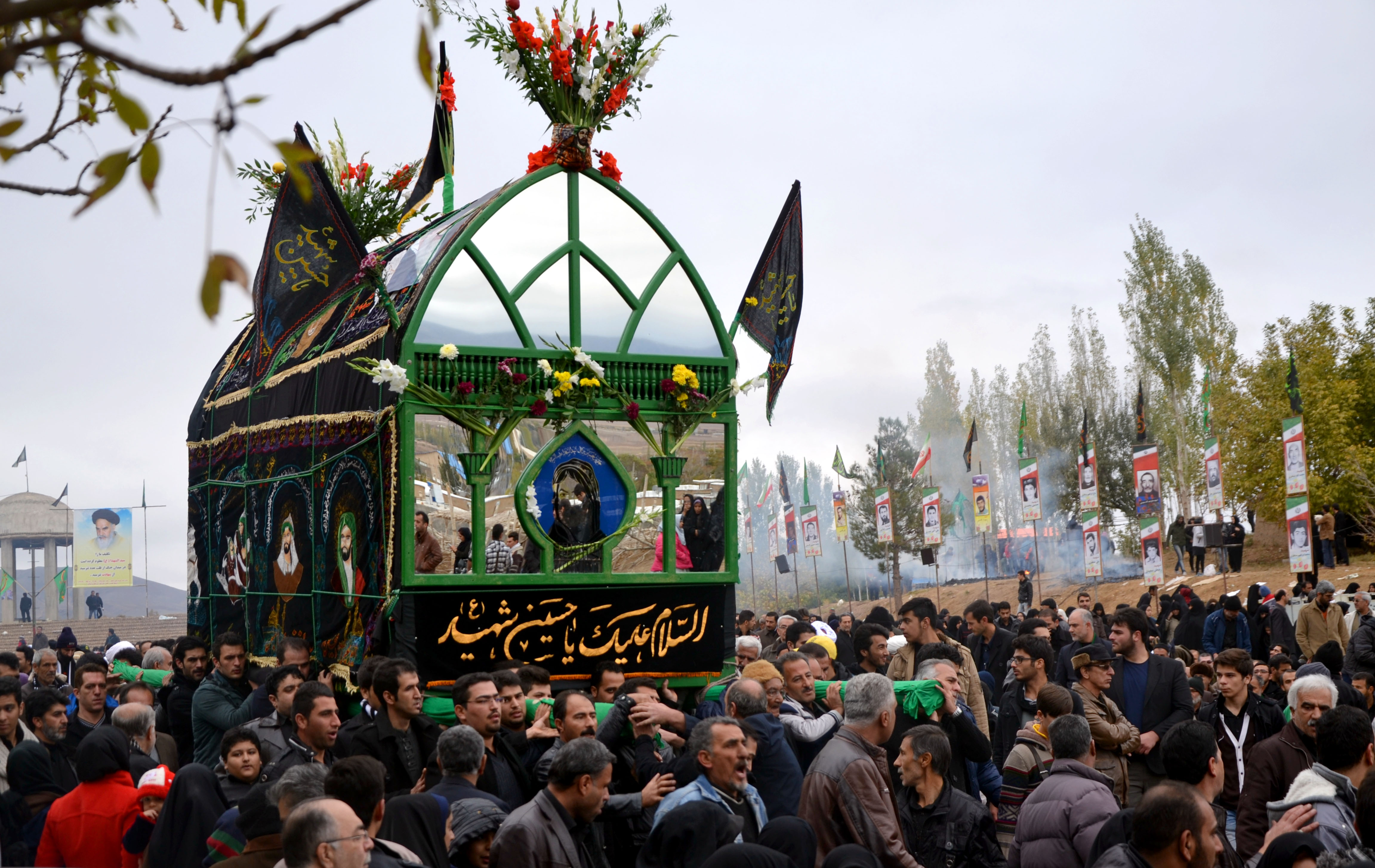
Nakhl Gardani ritual in progress
