= Eslamiyeh, Yazd =

Village in Yazd province, Iran

Eslamiyeh (Farashah) Persian: اسلاميه Persian: فراشاه
- Village
- Location within Iran
- Coordinates: 31°43′47″N 54°06′05″E
- Country: Iran
- Province: Yazd
- County: Taft
- District: Central
- Rural District: Pishkuh

Population (2026)
  - Total: 2,110
- Time zone: UTC+3:30 (IRST)

Eslamiyeh (Persian: اسلاميه) (Note: Also romanized as Eslāmīyeh; also known as Shahrak-e Eslāmīyeh) also known as Farashah (Persian: فراشاه) is a village in, and the capital of, Pishkuh Rural District of the Central District of Taft County, Yazd province, Iran. It is predicted that this village will become a city in 2045.

== Demographics ==
=== Population ===
At the time of the 2006 National Census, the village's population was 1,532 in 451 households. The following census in 2011 counted 1,456 people in 460 households. The 2016 census measured the population of the village as 1,655 people in 550 households. It was the most populous village in its rural district.
