= Aliabad Rural District (Taft County) =

Rural district in Yazd province, Iran

Aliabad Rural District Persian: دهستان علي اباد
- Rural District
- Location within Iran
- Coordinates: 31°40′02″N 53°50′20″E
- Country: Iran
- Province: Yazd
- County: Taft
- District: Central
- Capital: Aliabad

Population (2016)
  - Total: 1,970
- Time zone: UTC+3:30 (IRST)

Aliabad Rural District (Persian: دهستان علي اباد) is in the Central District of Taft County, Yazd province, Iran. Its capital is the village of Aliabad.

== Demographics ==
=== Population ===
At the time of the 2006 National Census, the rural district's population was 2,473 in 849 households. There were 2,349 inhabitants in 827 households at the following census of 2011. The 2016 census measured the population of the rural district as 1,970 in 740 households. The most populous of its 129 villages was Aliabad, with 715 people.
