= Jalal ed-Din Amir Chakhmaq Shami =

Iranian politician

Jalal-al-Din Amir-Chakhmaq, known as Jalal, was the Governor of Yazd, Iran in the Timurid era. The Amir Chakhmaq Complex in Yazd, Iran is named after him.
