= Qoroq-e Qavamcheh =

Qoroq-e Qavamcheh قرق قوام چه
- Village
- Country: Iran
- Province: Fars
- County: Sepidan
- Bakhsh: Beyza
- Rural District: Beyza

Population (2006)
  - Total: 42
- Time zone: UTC+3:30 (IRST)
  - Summer (DST): UTC+4:30 (IRDT)

Qoroq-e Qavamcheh (Persian: قرق قوام چه, also Romanized as Qoroq-e Qavāmcheh) is a village in Beyza Rural District, Beyza District, Sepidan County, Fars province, Iran. At the 2006 census, its population was 42, in 7 families.
