= Ashura =

Tenth day of the Islamic month of Muharram

Ashura عَاشُورَاء
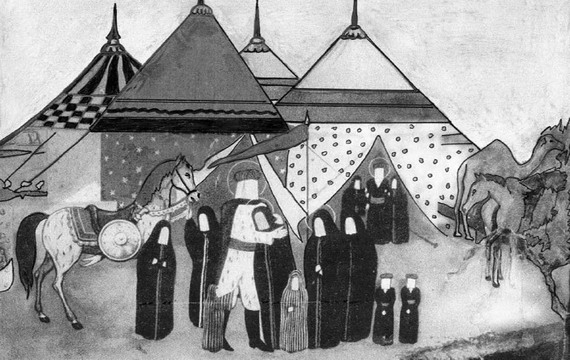
- Imam Husayn ibn ‘Alī ibn Abī Tālib bidding farewell to his family before marching to Karbalā’
- Also called: Youm-e Ashur
- Type: Islamic (Shia and Sunni)
- Significance: In Shia Islam: Mourning the death of Husayn ibn Ali, grandson of the Islamic prophet Muhammad and the third Shia imam In Sunni Islam: Commemorating God's parting of the Red Sea and his salvation of Moses and the Israelites from their slavery under the pharaoh
- Observances: In Shia Islam: Mourning rituals Distribution of food and drink (sabeel) In Sunni Islam: Voluntary fasting
- Date: 10 Muharram
- 2025 date: 6 July
- 2026 date: 26 June
- 2027 date: 15 June
- Duration: One day
- Frequency: Annual (Islamic calendar)

Ashura (Arabic: عَاشُورَاء, ʿĀshūrāʾ [ʕaːʃuːˈraːʔ]), also more formally as the Day of Ashura (Arabic: يوم عاشوراء, romanized: Yawm ʿĀshūrāʾ), is a day of commemoration in Islam. It occurs annually on the tenth of Muharram, the first month of the Islamic calendar. For Shia Muslims, Ashura is a day of mourning as they annually commemorate the death of Husayn, grandson of the Islamic prophet Muhammad and the third Shia Imam. Husayn's suffering and martyrdom are viewed by Muslims a symbol of sacrifice in the struggle for right against wrong, and for justice and truth against injustice and falsehood. Husayn and his companions are regarded as martyrs by all Muslim denominations.

Sunni Muslims also regard the killing of Husayn as a tragic event in Islamic history and commemorate it through sermons, remembrance, or other forms of reflection, although these observances generally differ from the mourning rituals characteristic of Shia Islam, particularly the more intensive forms of ritual mourning practiced. Ashura also marks the parting of the Red Sea by Moses and the salvation of the Israelites. It is also believed that on this day, Noah disembarked from the Ark, God forgave Adam, and Joseph was released from prison. Ashura is observed by Sunni Muslims through supererogatory fasting, prayer, and charitable acts. Some Sunni communities have also observed the day through celebratory practices, though certain forms of joyful commemoration have been criticized by Sunni scholars.

== Etymology ==
Ashura is an Aramaic word meaning 'tenth'. It may have also been derived from the Syriac words asiroya or asora. It shares the same root as the Hebrew word 'āsōr. In Arabic, Ashura refers to the tenth day of Muharram, the first month of the Islamic calendar, a month in which fighting has been forbidden since before the advent of Islam.

== Origins ==
Fasting on Ashura was a Jewish practice adopted by the Islamic prophet Muhammad after his arrival in the city of Medina in 622 CE, and Hadith literature explicitly derives the holiday from Yom Kippur (lit. 'day of atonement').

When the Prophet (ﷺ) arrived at Medina, he noticed that the people from the Jews used to respect the 10th of Muharram and fasted on it. The Prophet (ﷺ) then said, "We have more right to observe the fast on this day." and ordered that fasting should be observed on it.

— Sahih al-Bukhari 3942

After it became optional, fasting on Ashura slowly ceased to be a religious obligation after about a year when the relations with the Medinan Jews deteriorated. This transition is often associated with verses 2:183–5 of the Quran, the central religious text in Islam, which explicitly designate Ramadan as the primary month of fasting.

Some scholars deem it improbable that Ashura initially coincided with the tenth of Muharram. Instead, Ashura was probably even observed on the same day as Yom Kippur, celebrated on the tenth day of the Jewish month of Tishrei. The association of Ashura with the tenth of Muharram thus happened later, some time after the Jewish and Muslim calendars diverged. In turn, the calendars began to diverge when Muhammad forbade Jewish-type calendar adjustments in connection with verse 9:37 of the Quran.

== In Sunni Islam ==
A similar origin story for Ashura appears in some Sunni traditions. Alternatively, there are traditions in canonical Sunni collections that describe fasting on Ashura as a pre-Islamic practice among the Quraysh tribe, in which Muhammad also partook while he was in Mecca.(r. 661–750), link Ashura to various auspicious events: On this day, Moses parted the Red Sea, Noah disembarked from the Ark, God forgave Adam, Joseph was released from prison, Jesus, Abraham, and Adam were born, Muhammad was conceived, and Jonah was freed from the fish that had swallowed him.

=== Customs ===
In Sunni Islam, ninth and tenth of Muharram are days for voluntary fasting, strongly encouraged by Sunni jurists. While not endorsed by all Sunni scholars, Ashura is further viewed as a day of thanksgiving (shukr) to God, a joyous occasion, celebrated through pious acts and acceptable expressions of delight. Ashura is thus an important festival for many Sunnis, in contrast to the Shia, who mourn on this day the slaughter of Muhammad's grandson, Husayn ibn Ali, and his small retinue in the Battle of Karbala in 680. Such Sunni festivities either developed in response to Shia customs on Ashura or with the influence of pre-Islamic traditions. In line with the former view, under the Umayyad caliph Abd al-Malik ibn Marwan (r. 685–705), Ashura was celebrated as a festive public holiday to counter the commemoration of Husayn. The Abbasid caliph al-Qadir (r. 991–1031) did so too in Baghdad, Iraq. Another instance is the reenactment by a Sunni mob of the Battle of the Camel (656) against Ali ibn Abi Talib, the first Shia imam, in the Buyid-era Baghdad on Ashura 973.

Whatever the case is for their origins, such festivities were firmly established by the time of the Sunni jurist Ibn Taymiyya (d. 1328), to whom a questioner wrote, observing that people are joyful on Ashura; they bathe, adorn themselves, shake hands with each other, and cook grains. In the Maghreb, for instance, Ashura is celebrated today through fasting, almsgiving, honoring the dead, special dishes, jumping over bonfires, and carnivals. Nevertheless, particularly in South Asia, some Sunnis participated in the Shia rituals on Ashura, at least until modern times. Sufis also commonly commemorated the death of Husayn, more so in the earlier times, despite its variance with the views of the Sunni elite. For Sufis, rather than a tragedy, Ashura celebrates the eternal life of Husayn and his companions, who annihilated themselves in the Divine with their martyrdom.

== In Shia Islam ==
=== Battle of Karbala ===
In Shia Islam, Ashura commemorates the death of Husayn ibn Ali, Muhammad's grandson and the third Shia imam. Husayn was killed, alongside most of his male relatives and his small retinue, on 10 Muharram 61 AH (10 October 680) in the Battle of Karbala against the army of the Umayyad caliph Yazid ibn Mu'awiya (r. 680–683), having been surrounded for some days and deprived of the drinking water of the nearby Euphrates river. After the battle, the women and children in Husayn's camp were taken prisoner and marched to the capital Damascus in Syria. The battle followed failed negotiations and Husayn's refusal to pledge his allegiance to Yazid, who is often portrayed by Muslim historians as impious and immoral. The fight took place in the desert land of Karbala, en route to the nearby Kufa, whose residents had invited Husayn to lead them against Yazid.

=== Significance ===
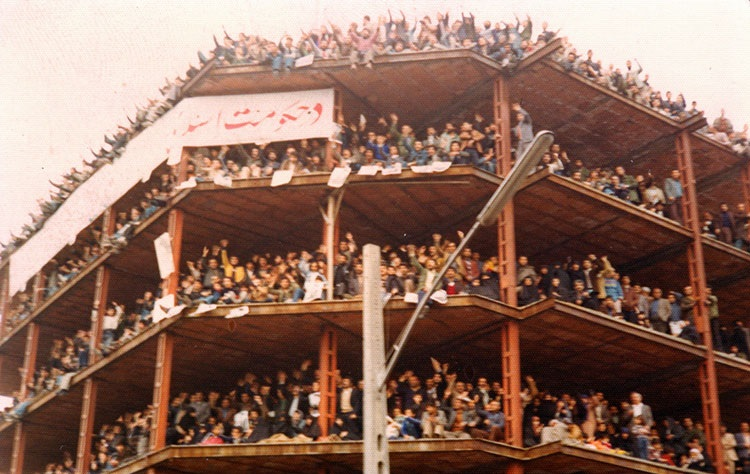
Ashura demonstrations against the Pahlavids in Iran, 1978

Ashura is a day of mourning and grief for Shia Muslims. It was observed as such by their imams, who also frequently encouraged the Shia community to follow suit. For instance, a tradition attributed to the Shia imam Ali al-Rida (d. 818) describes Ashura as a day of grieving and somber resignation from material affairs. Shia tradition also dismisses as fabricated those Sunni hadiths that mark Ashura as a joyful occasion. Indeed, traditions attributed to the Shia imams forbid fasting on this day, and promise eternal punishment for those who celebrate Ashura as a day of blessing.

In Shia Islam, Karbala symbolizes the eternal struggle between good and evil, the pinnacle of self-sacrifice, and the ultimate sabotage of Muhammad's prophetic mission. Historically, the event served to crystallize the Shia community into a distinct sect and remains an integral part of their religious identity to date. On the one hand, mourners share in the pain of Husayn and hope to benefit from his intercession on the Day of Judgement. On the other, they view mourning for Husayn as an act of protest against oppression, a struggle for God (jihad), and as such an act of worship.

=== Rituals ===
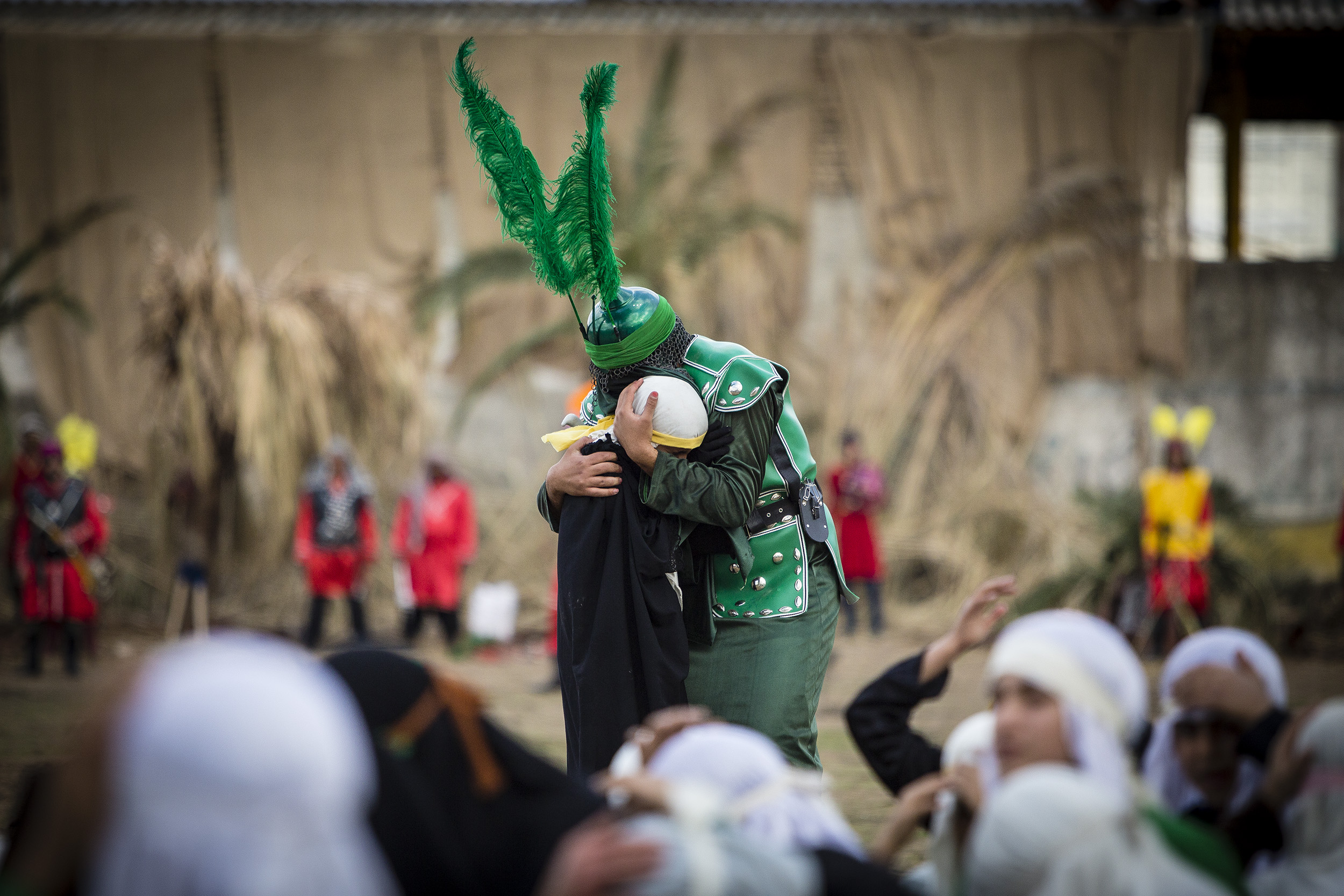
Shia passion play (ta'ziya) in Iran

In addition to pilgrimage to the shrine of Husayn, located in Karbala, Iraq, Shia Muslims annually commemorate the events of Karbala throughout the months of Muharram and Safar. Most rituals take place during the first ten days of Muharram, culminating on Ashura with processions in major Shia cities. The main component of ritual ceremonies (majalis, sing. majlis) is the narration of the stories of Karbala (rawza-khwani, qiraya), and the recitation of elegies and dirges (nawha, niyaha, marsia-khwani), all intended to raise the sympathy of audience and move them to tears. A majlis often takes place in a dedicated building or structure, known variously as Husayniya, takiya, imambarah, or azakhana. Another component of mourning gatherings is the self-flagellation of participants to the rhythm of Karbala elegies. Rooted in ancient Arab practices, mild forms of self-flagellation, that is, striking one's face and chest in grief (latm, sina-zani, matam), are common today in Shia communities. But there are also extreme forms of self-flagellation (tatbir, tiq-zani, qama-zani), in which the participants strike themselves, usually on the forehead or back, with knives, swords, or chains to which razor blades are attached. Banned in Iran and the Shia communities of Lebanon since the mid-90s, instrumental self-flagellation has been condemned by many Shia clerics, and it remains an often controversial practice among the Shia. Another mourning ritual is the dramatic reenactment of Karbala narratives (ta'ziyeh or shabih-khani), practiced today in Iran, in the western Gulf shore, and in Lebanon. On Ashura, always the "martyrdom of Husayn" is reenacted in such performances. In Karbala, an annual performance on Ashura reenacts the burning of Husayn's tents after the battle by the Umayyads and the captivity of the women and children. During Muharram, especially on Ashura, processions of mourners (dasta, mawkib) march the streets, chanting dirges and elegies, sometimes accompanied by self-flagellation. For instance, in the tawarij march in Karbala, male and then female mourners walk barefoot to the shrine of Husayn in the afternoon of Ashura. Depending on the region, processions carry symbolic objects, such as alam (lit. 'flag'), nakhl (lit. 'date palm'), ta'ziya, and tadjah. Alam represents the ensign of Husayn in Karbala, while the last three objects symbolize his bier or tomb.

Shia rituals of Ashura

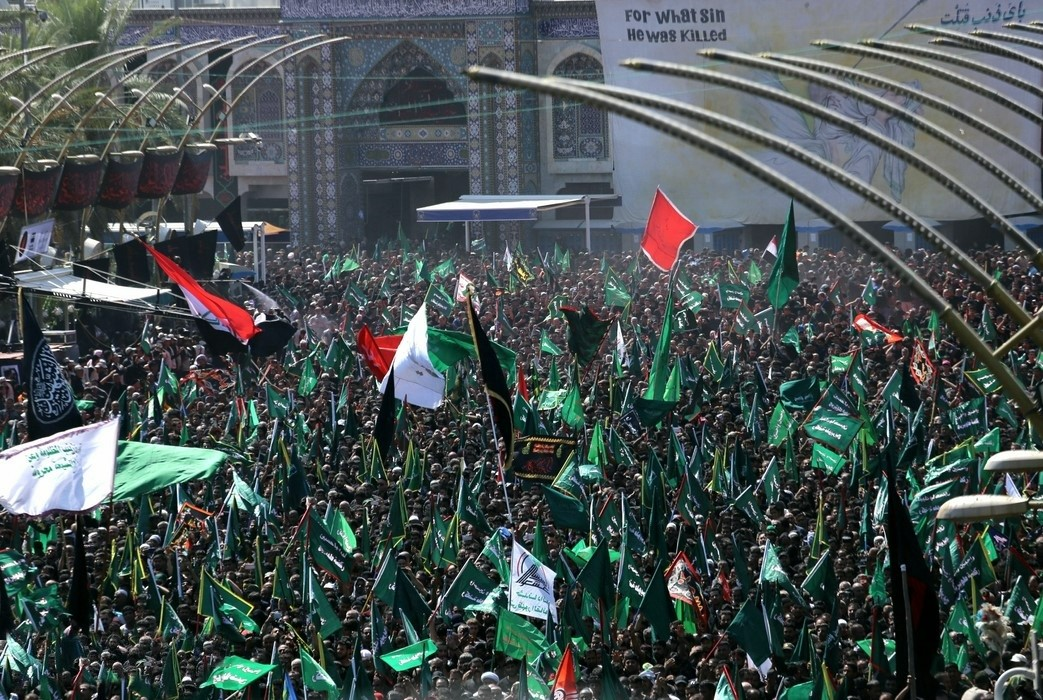
Tawarij march on Ashura, Karbala

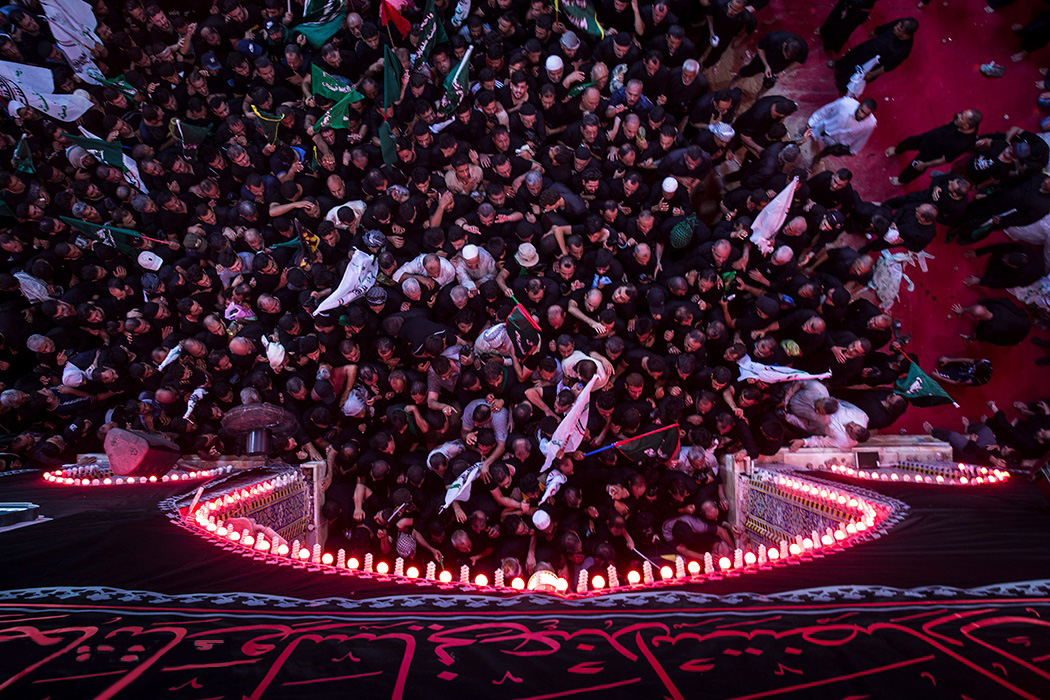

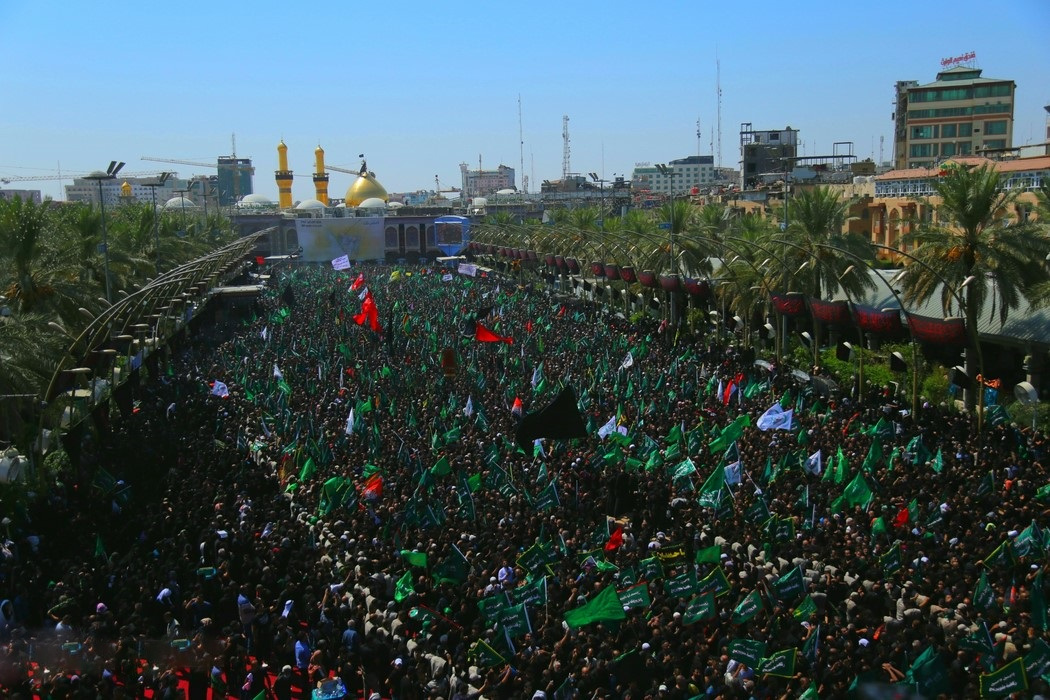
Tuwairij run, 2019

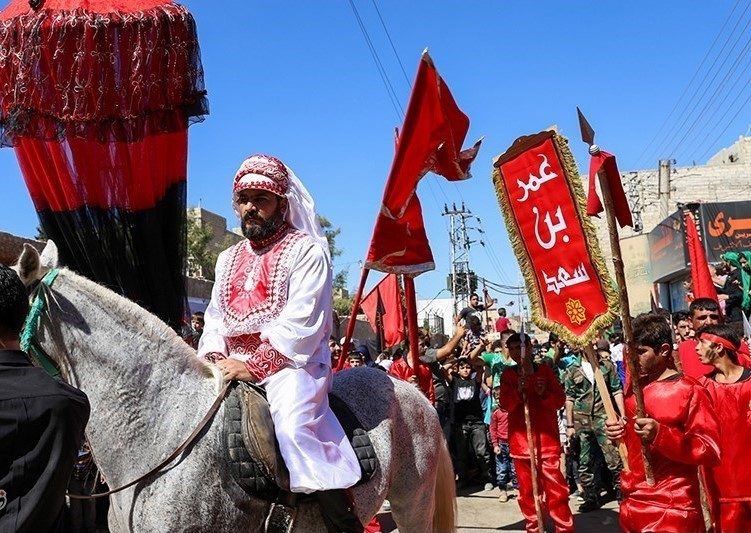
Ashura procession in Syria

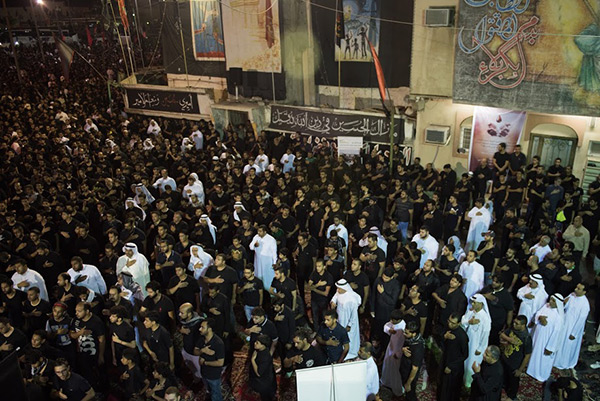
Shia mourners on Ashura in Saudi Arabia

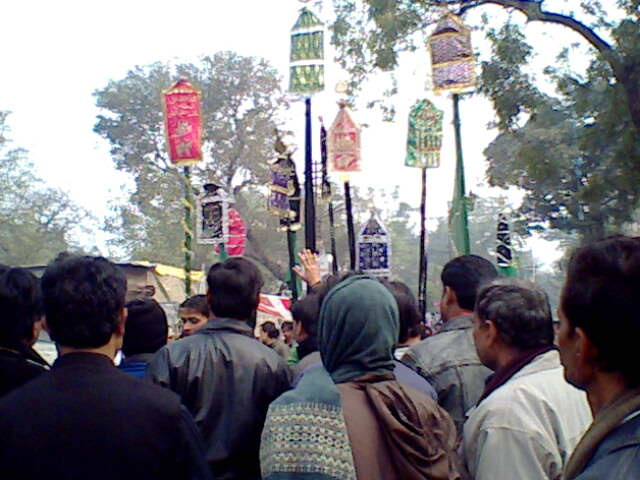
Ashura procession in India carrying alams, signifying the ensign of Husayn in Karbala

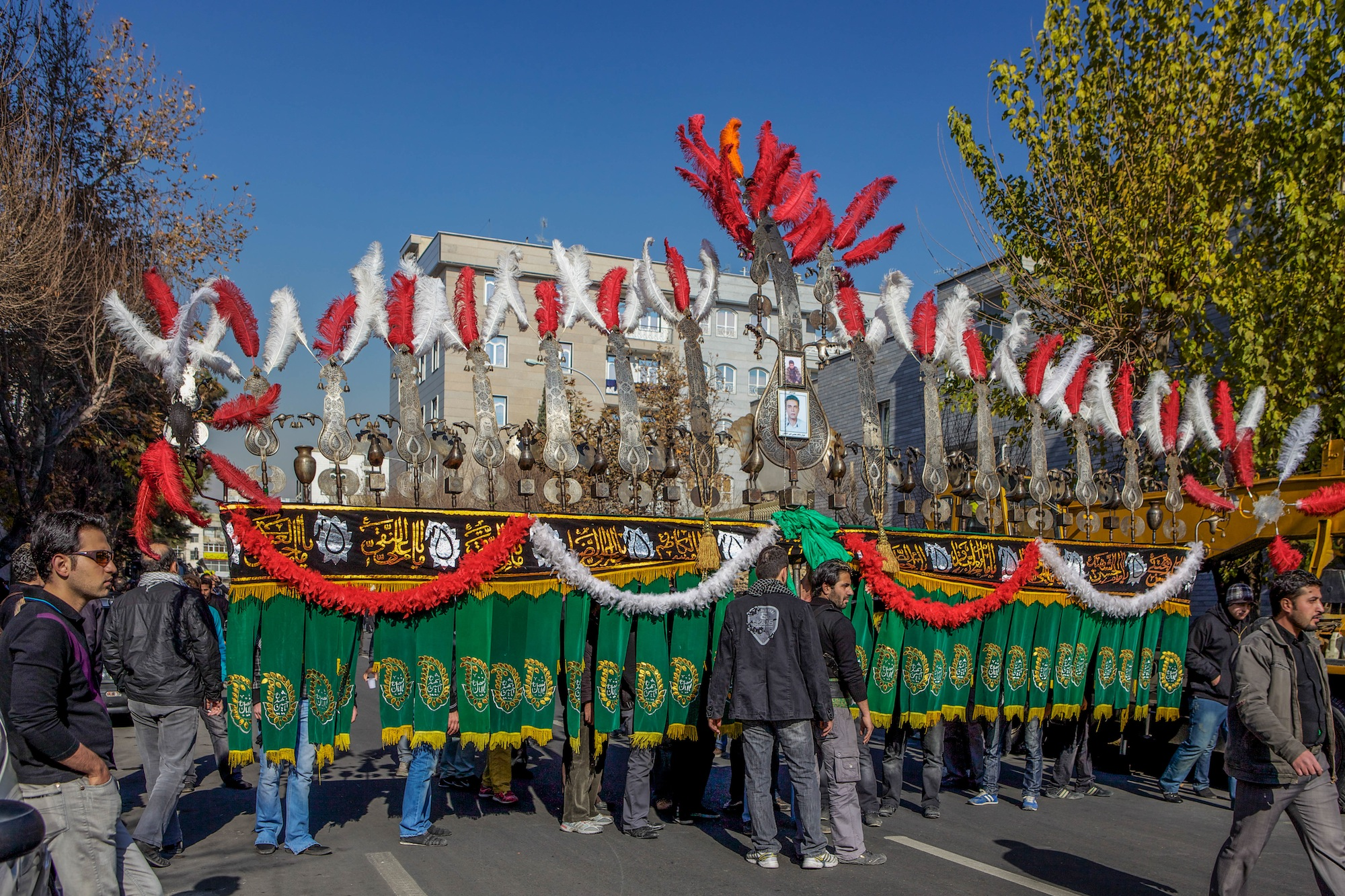
Alam of an Ashura procession in Iran

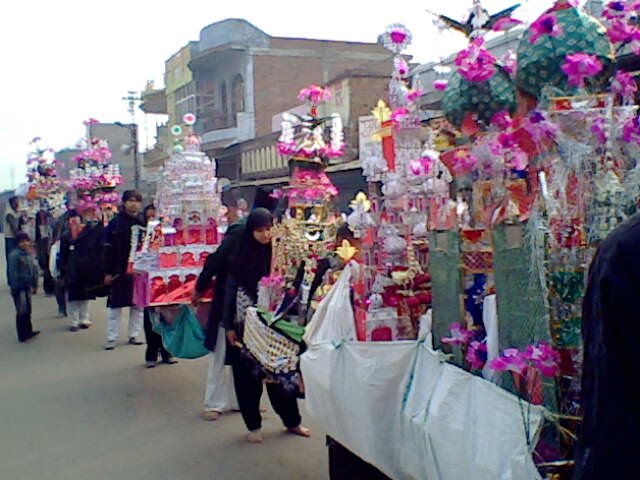
In India, ta'ziya symbolizes Husayn's bier

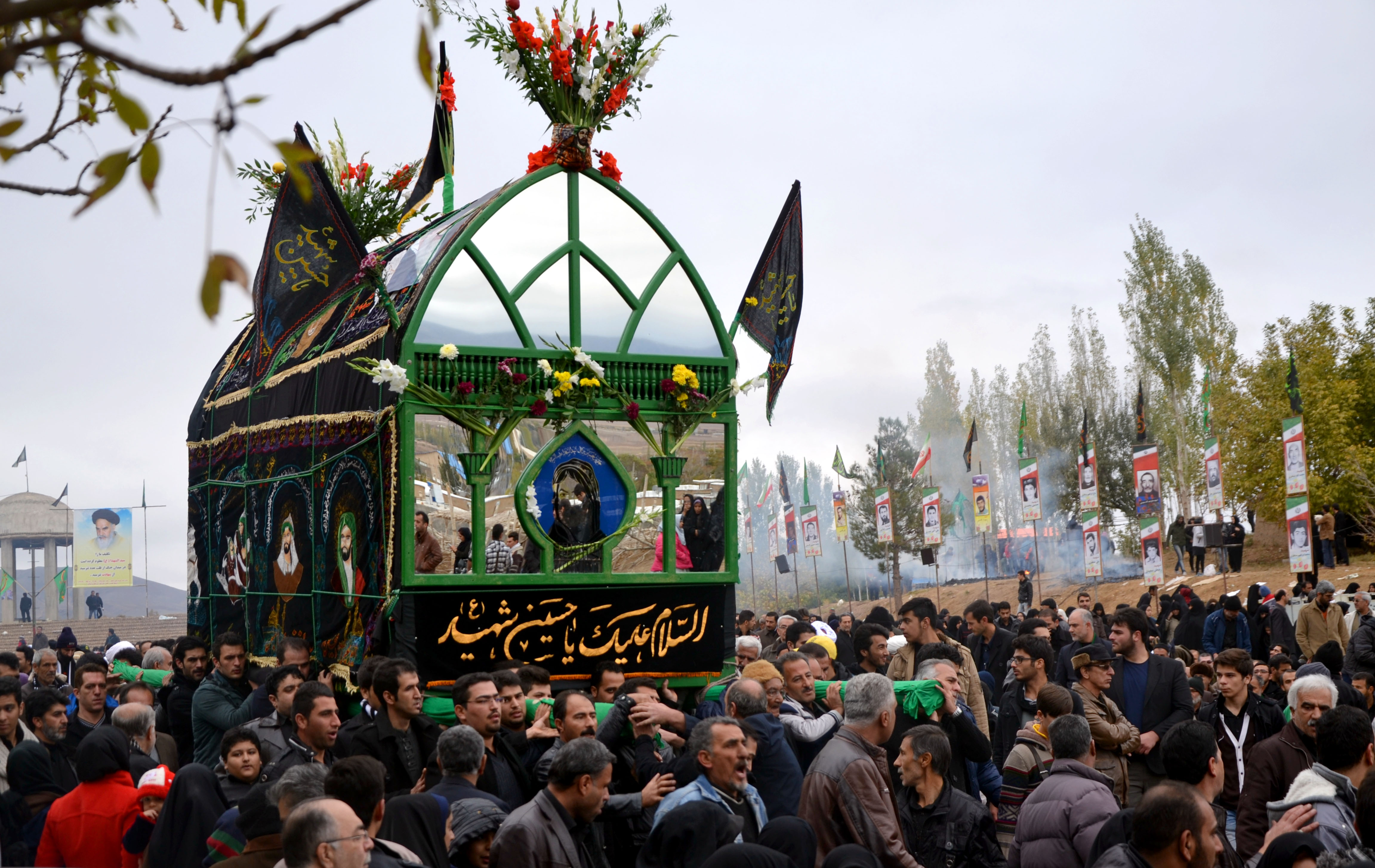
In Iran, nakhl symbolizes Husayn's bier

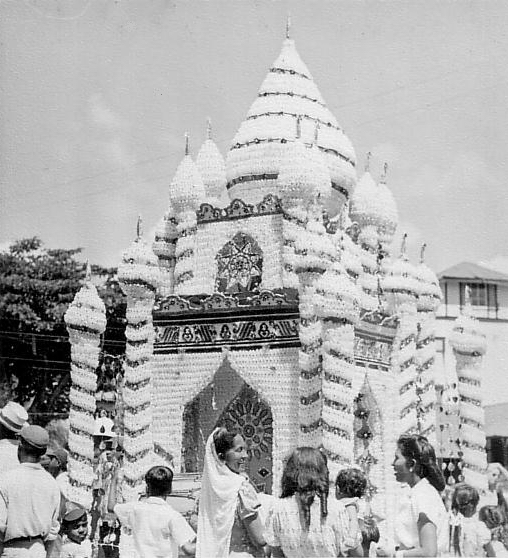
Tadjah represents Husayn's tomb, Hosay ritual in Trinidad, 1950s

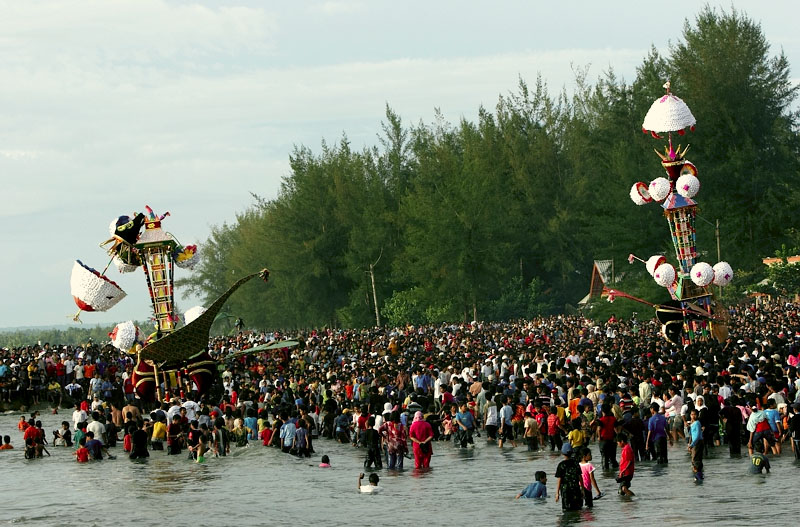
Submerging tabuiks on Ashura in a mock funeral of Husayn, Indonesia

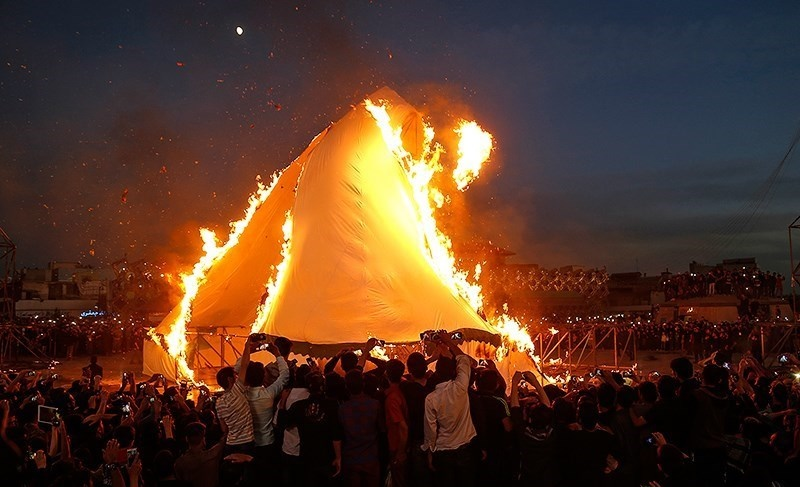
Ashura reenactment of the burning of Husayn's tents, Iran

== Terrorist attacks during Ashura ==
Ashura has sometimes been an occasion for Sunni violence against Shia Muslims, who are often a minority in Muslim communities. In India, for instance, the Sunni activist Ahmad Barelvi (d. 1831) preached against Ashura rituals and, probably with some exaggeration, boasted of destroying thousands of imambargahs, which are buildings dedicated to ritual mourning. Some terrorist attacks against Ashura services are listed below.

- 1940: Bomb thrown at an Ashura procession, Delhi, India, 21 February.
- 1994: Bomb explosion in the Imam Reza shrine, Mashhad, Iran, 20 June, 20 people killed.
- 2004: Bomb explosions, Karbala and Najaf, Iraq, 2 March, over 180 Shia worshipers killed and 5000 injured.
- 2008: Two separate attacks on Ashura processions, Iraq, 19 January, 9 people killed.
- 2009: Bomb explosion in an Ashura procession, Karachi, Pakistan, 28 December, 43 people killed and 60 injured.
- 2011: Multiple bomb explosions in Ashura processions, Central Iraq, 6 December, 30 people killed.
- 2011: Two separate bomb explosions among Ashura mourners, Kabul, Afghanistan, 6 December, 80 people killed and 160 injured.
- 2015: Bomb explosions in a mosque, Dhaka, Bangladesh, 24 October, one worshipper killed and 80 injured.

== In the Gregorian calendar ==
Ashura, tenth of Muharram in the Islamic calendar, corresponds to a different day every year in the Gregorian calendar.

Islamic calendar	1447	1448	1449
Gregorian calendar	5 July 2025	25 June 2026	15 June 2027

== See also ==
- Mourning of Muharram
- Tasu'a
- Twelver Shia holy days
- Ziyarat Ashura
- Baba Aishur
