= Shirkuh Rural District =

Rural district in Yazd province, Iran

Shirkuh Rural District Persian: دهستان شيركوه
- Rural District
- Location within Iran
- Coordinates: 31°37′33″N 54°08′51″E
- Country: Iran
- Province: Yazd
- County: Taft
- District: Central
- Capital: Tezerjan

Population (2016)
  - Total: 1,045
- Time zone: UTC+3:30 (IRST)

Shirkuh Rural District (Persian: دهستان شيركوه) is in the Central District of Taft County, Yazd province, Iran. Its capital is the village of Tezerjan.

== Demographics ==
=== Population ===
At the time of the 2006 National Census, the rural district's population was 1,720 in 632 households. There were 1,309 inhabitants in 573 households at the following census of 2011. The 2016 census measured the population of the rural district as 1,045 in 420 households. The most populous of its 30 villages was Tezerjan, with 355 people.
