= Pishkuh Rural District (Taft County) =

Rural district in Yazd province, Iran

Pishkuh Rural District Persian: دهستان پيشكوه
- Rural District
- Location within Iran
- Coordinates: 31°40′55″N 54°04′55″E
- Country: Iran
- Province: Yazd
- County: Taft
- District: Central
- Capital: Eslamiyeh

Population (2016)
  - Total: 4,492
- Time zone: UTC+3:30 (IRST)

Pishkuh Rural District (Persian: دهستان پيشكوه) is in the Central District of Taft County, Yazd province, Iran. Its capital is the village of Eslamiyeh.

== Demographics ==
=== Population ===
At the time of the 2006 National Census, the rural district's population was 4,310 in 1,281 households. There were 4,284 inhabitants in 1,289 households at the following census of 2011. The 2016 census measured the population of the rural district as 4,492 in 1,383 households. The most populous of its 150 villages was Eslamiyeh, with 1,655 people.
