= Taft, Iran =

City in Yazd province, Iran

Taft Persian: تفت
- City
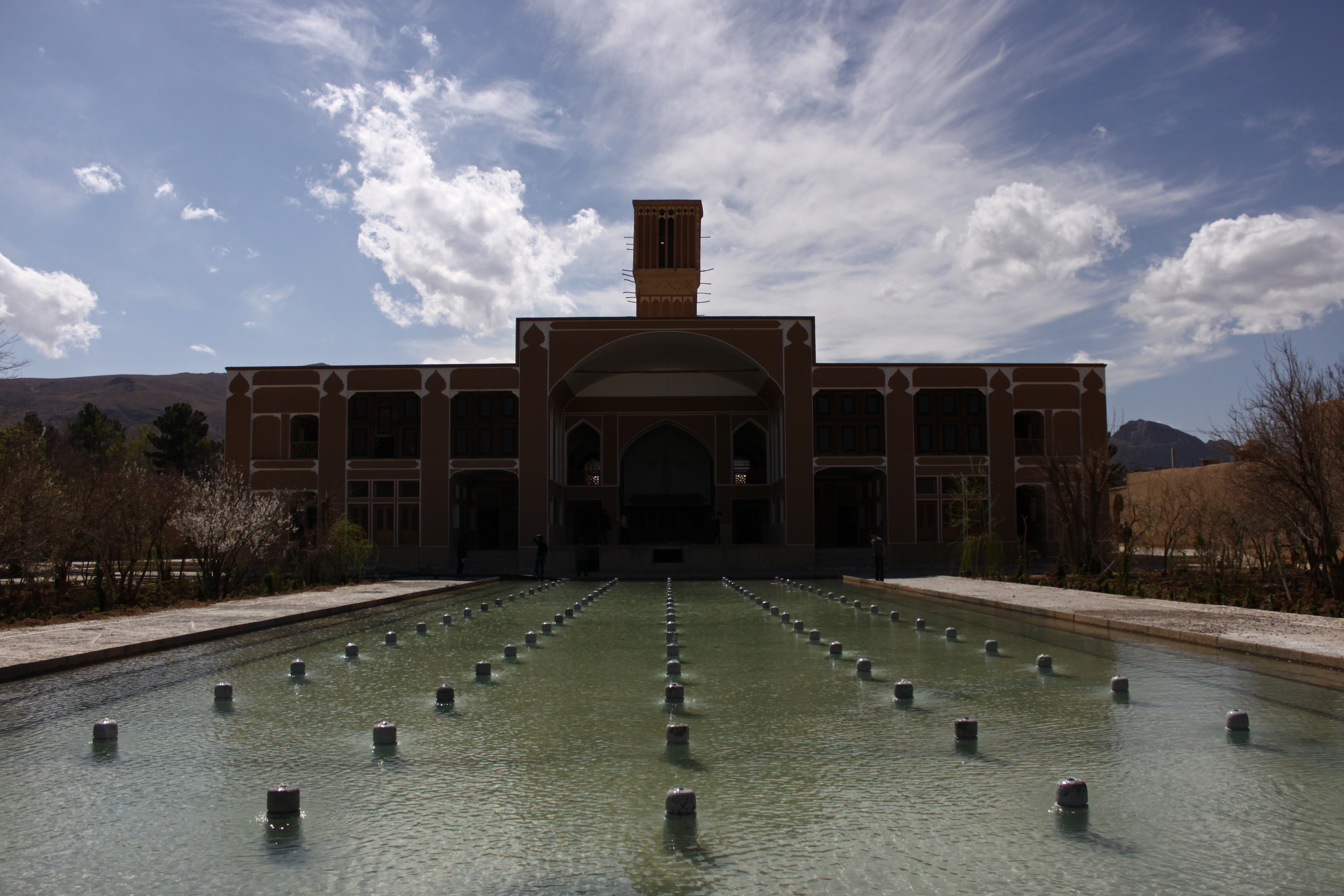
- Sadri Garden (Bagh-e Namir), Bagh-e Golestan neighborhood in south-eastern Taft

- Location within Iran
- Coordinates: 31°44′58″N 54°12′32″E
- Country: Iran
- Province: Yazd
- County: Taft
- District: Central

Population (2016)
  - Total: 18,464
- Time zone: UTC+3:30 (IRST)

Taft (Persian: تفت) is a city in the Central District of Taft County, Yazd province, Iran, serving as capital of both the county and the district.

== Demographics ==
=== Population ===
At the time of the 2006 National Census, the city's population was 15,329 in 4,265 households. The following census in 2011 counted 15,717 people in 4,564 households. The 2016 census measured the population of the city as 18,464 people in 5,649 households.

== History ==
In the 15th century, Taft was home to Sufi poet Shah Nimatullah Wali.

Following the Iranian Constitutional Revolution of 1906, a rebellion broke out in Taft, led by Mohammad Bana, who with his armed bandits briefly took over the government seat in Yazd. The rebellion was crushed in 1911 and Bana fled back to Taft.

== Location ==
Taft is located 20 kilometers southwest of the city of Yazd and is located at an altitude of 1,560 meters.

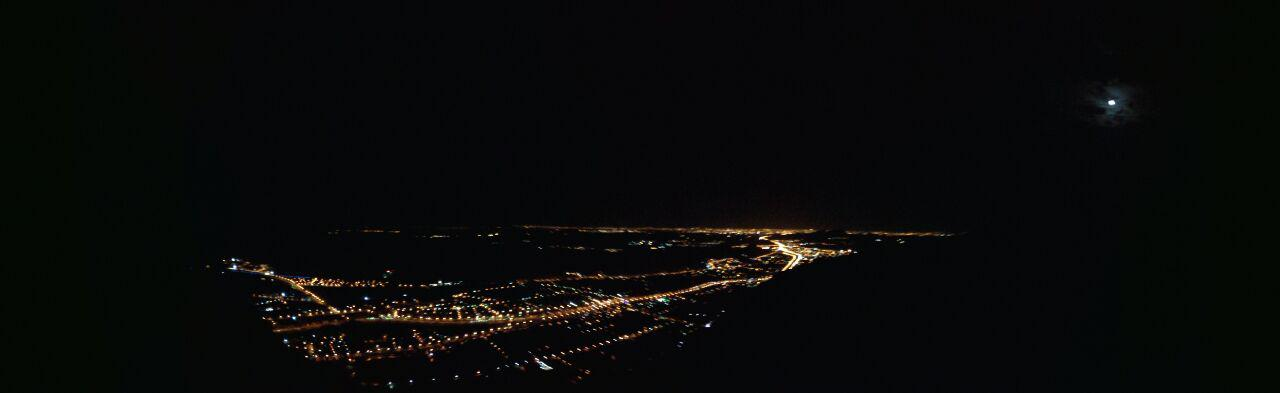
