= Nasrabad Rural District (Taft County) =

Rural district in Yazd province, Iran

Nasrabad Rural District Persian: دهستان نصراباد
- Rural District
- Location within Iran
- Coordinates: 31°45′11″N 53°45′02″E
- Country: Iran
- Province: Yazd
- County: Taft
- District: Central
- Capital: Nasrabad

Population (2016)
  - Total: 3,628
- Time zone: UTC+3:30 (IRST)

Nasrabad Rural District (Persian: دهستان نصراباد) is in the Central District of Taft County, Yazd province, Iran. Its capital is the village of Nasrabad.

== Demographics ==
=== Population ===
At the time of the 2006 National Census, the rural district's population was 3,821 in 1,256 households. There were 5,142 inhabitants in 1,700 households at the following census of 2011. The 2016 census measured the population of the rural district as 3,628 in 1,253 households. The most populous of its 160 villages was Nasrabad, with 1,898 people.
