= Central District (Taft County) =

District in Yazd province, Iran

Central District (Taft County) Persian: بخش مرکزی شهرستان تفت
- District
- Location within Iran
- Coordinates: 31°30′28″N 53°44′45″E
- Country: Iran
- Province: Yazd
- County: Taft
- Capital: Taft

Population (2016)
  - Total: 32,454
- Time zone: UTC+3:30 (IRST)

The Central District of Taft County (Persian: بخش مرکزی شهرستان تفت) is in Yazd province, Iran. Its capital is the city of Taft.

== Demographics ==
=== Population ===
At the time of the 2006 National Census, the district's population was 30,826 in 9,330 households. The following census in 2011 counted 31,368 people in 9,864 households. The 2016 census measured the population of the district as 32,454 inhabitants in 10,467 households.

=== Administrative divisions ===
Central District (Taft County) Population
Administrative Divisions	2006	2011	2016
Aliabad RD	2,473	2,349	1,970
Dehshir RD	3,173	2,567	2,855
Nasrabad RD	3,821	5,142	3,628
Pishkuh RD	4,310	4,284	4,492
Shirkuh RD	1,720	1,309	1,045
Taft (city)	15,329	15,717	18,464
Total	30,826	31,368	32,454
RD = Rural District
