= Alamat =

Alamat may refer to:

- Alamat (band), a Filipino boy band
- Alamat (TV program), a Philippine television drama
- Alamat, a Shi'ite banner or standard used in mourning processions
