= Mourning of Muharram =

Set of rituals in Shia Islam

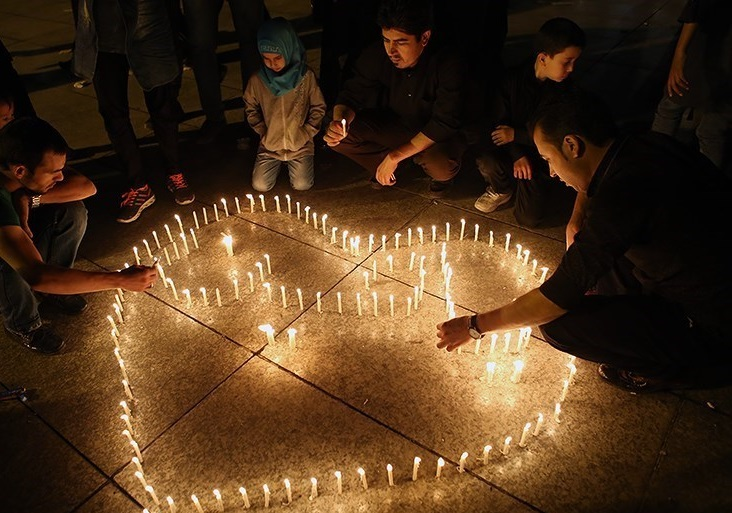
- Muharram mourning gathering on the night of Ashura in Tehran, Iran
- Observed by: Shia Muslims; Some Sunnis
- Significance: Marks the death of Husayn ibn Ali, grandson of the Islamic prophet Muhammad and the third Shia imam

Mourning of Muharram (Arabic: عَزَاءُ ٱلْمُحَرَّمِ, romanized: ʿAzāʾ al-Muḥarram; Persian: عزاداری محرم, romanized: ʿAzādārī-i Muḥarram; Azerbaijani: Məhərrəmlik / محرمليک) is a set of religious rituals observed by Shia Muslims during the month of Muharram, the first month of the Islamic calendar. These annual rituals commemorate the death of Husayn ibn Ali, grandson of the Islamic prophet Muhammad and the third Shia Imam. Husayn and his small retinue were slaughtered in the Battle of Karbala on 10 Al-Muharram 61 AH (680 CE) by the army of the Umayyad caliph Yazid I (r. 680–683). Husayn's suffering and martyrdom became a symbol of sacrifice in the struggle for right against wrong, and for justice and truth against injustice and falsehood. He is a universal, borderless, interfaith and meta-religion symbol. Husayn and his companions are widely regarded as martyrs by all Muslims.

Mourning for Karbala began with its female survivors, particularly Husayn's sister Zaynab, and evolved over time into distinct rituals that help define the Shia identity. Nowadays, most mourning rituals take place during the first ten days of Al-Muharram, culminating with processions on the tenth day, known as Ashura. The main component of mourning ceremonies is the recitation of Karbala narratives intended to raise the sympathy of audience and move them to tears. Elegies and dirges are also chanted in such gatherings, as the participants strike their chests to share in the pain of Husayn and benefit from his intercession on the Day of Judgement. Extreme forms of self-flagellation are also sometimes practiced, often involving self-inflicted bloodshed. Theatrical reenactment of Karbala narratives is a historically significant ritual found mostly in Iran.

== Origins ==
Muharram is the first month of the Islamic calendar and one of the four sacred months in which warfare is prohibited in Islam. In Shia Islam, the tenth of Muharram, known as Ashura, commemorates the death of Husayn ibn Ali, the grandson of the Islamic prophet Muhammad. Husayn was killed, alongside most of his male relatives and his small retinue, on 10 Muharram 61 AH (10 October 680 CE) in the Battle of Karbala against the much larger army of the Umayyad caliph Yazid ibn Mu'awiya (r. 680–683), having been surrounded for some days and deprived of the drinking water of the nearby Euphrates river. After the battle, the women and children in Husayn's camp were taken prisoner and marched to the capital Damascus in Syria. The battle followed failed negotiations and Husayn's refusal to pledge his allegiance to Yazid, who is often portrayed by Muslim historians as impious and immoral. The fight took place in the desert land of Karbala, en route to the nearby Kufa, whose residents had earlier invited Husayn to lead them against Yazid.

== Muharram rituals in Shia Islam ==
In addition to pilgrimage to the shrine of Husayn, located in Karbala, Iraq, Shia Muslims annually commemorate the events of Karbala throughout the months of Muharram and Safar, following the precedent of their imams. Most rituals take place during the first ten days of Muharram, culminating on the tenth with processions in major Shia cities. The main component of ritual ceremonies (majalis, sing. majlis) is the narration of the stories of Karbala (rawza-khwani, qiraya), and the recitation of elegies and dirges (nawha, niyaha, marsia-khwani), all intended to raise the sympathy of audience and move them to tears. A majlis often takes place in a dedicated building or structure, known variously as Husayniya, takiya, imambara, or azakhana.

=== Self-flagellation ===
Another component of mourning gatherings is the self-flagellation of participants to the rhythm of Karbala elegies. Rooted in ancient Arab practices, mild forms of self-flagellation, striking one's face and chest in grief (latm, sina-zani, matam), are common today in mourning rituals, intended to share in the pain of Husayn. Striking one's back with special chains (zanjir-zani) is another harmless practice, found in Iran and Iraq. But there are also extreme forms of self-flagellation (tatbir, tiq-zani, qama-zani), in which the participants strike themselves, usually on the forehead or back, with knives, swords, or chains to which razor blades are attached. Banned by Iran and the Shia Hezbollah party of Lebanon since the mid-90s, instrumental self-flagellation has been condemned by many Shia clerics, and it remains an often controversial practice among the Shia.

=== Passion plays ===
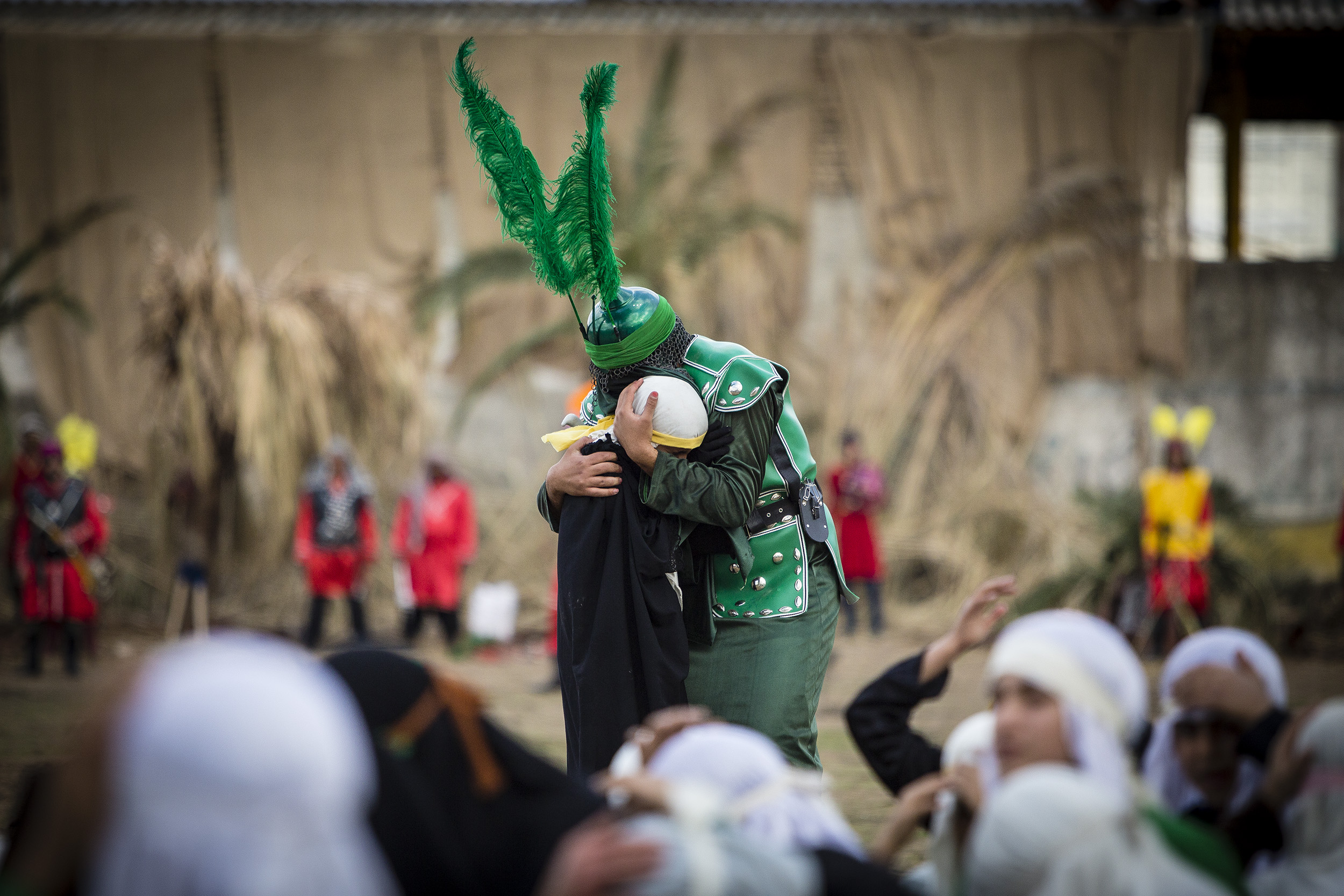
Shia passion play (ta'ziya) in Iran

Ta'ziya or shabih-khwani is the dramatic reenactment of Karbala narratives, practiced today in Iran, in Shia communities of the western Gulf shore, and in Lebanon. The Arabic word ta'ziya itself is the verbal noun of azza (lit. 'to mourn'). Such plays may be performed in public spaces or dedicated buildings, like Husayniyas. While Karbala is its focus, the ta'ziya repertoire also includes plays about early prophets and contemporary figures. On Ashura, however, always the "martyrdom of Husayn" is reenacted in such performances. Since the Islamic Revolution in 1978–1979, some ta'ziya performances are televised and sponsored by the Iranian government to preserve this fading tradition. In Iraq, there are no widespread ta'ziya rituals today, although an annual performance on Ashura in Karbala reenacts the burning of Husayn's tents after the battle by the Umayyads and the captivity of the women and children.

=== Processions ===
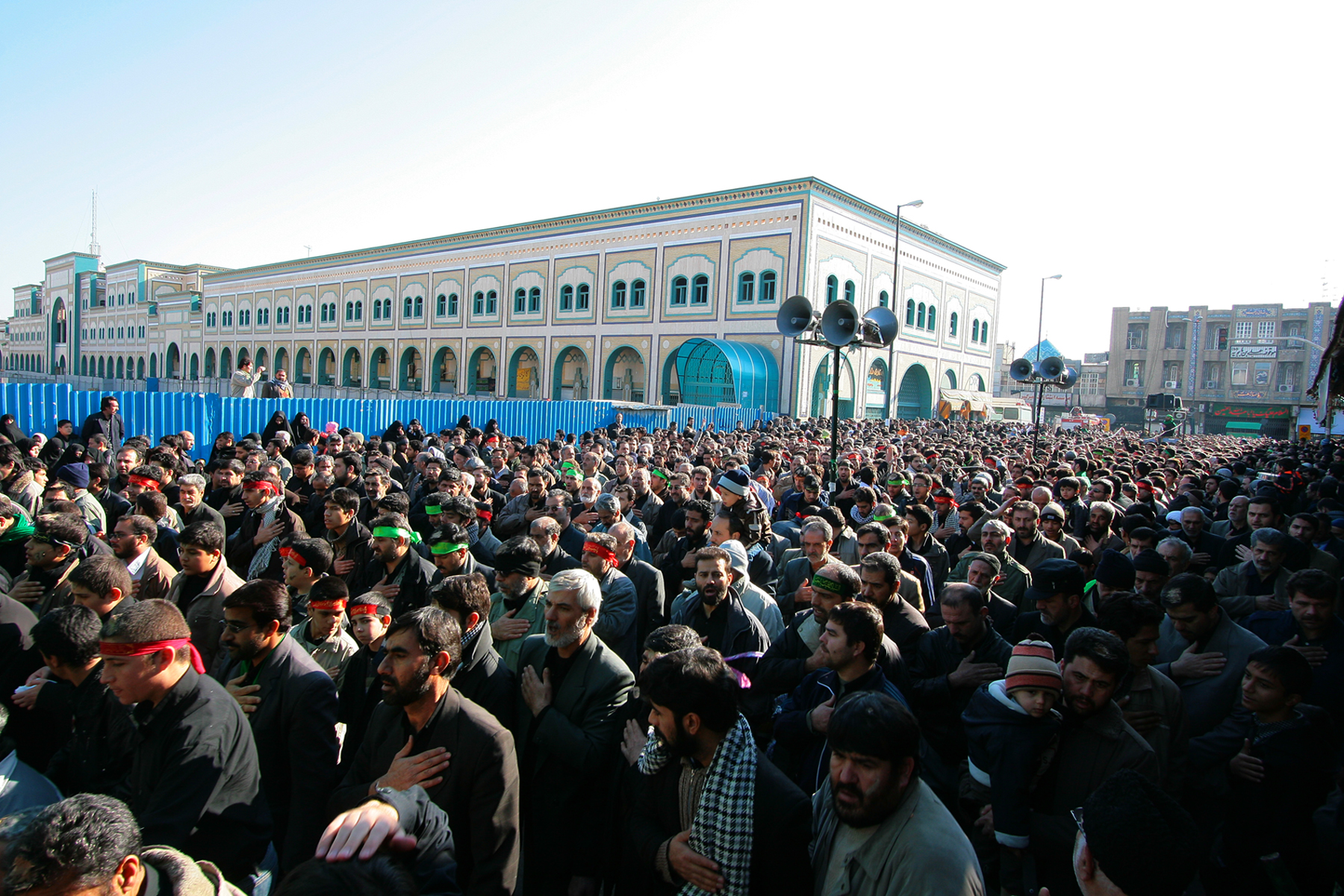
Procession of mourners in Iran

Processions of mourners (dasta, juloos, mawkib) annually march the streets in Muharram, especially on Ashura, chanting dirges and elegies, sometimes accompanied by self-flagellation. These processions typically start and end at the local Husayniya, and occasionally represent various local guilds. In Najaf, Iraq, mourners march on the eve of Ashura toward the shrine of Ali ibn Abi Talib, the first Shia imam, carrying decorative torches (masha'il). In the tawarij march in Karbala, male and then female mourners walk barefoot to the shrine of Husayn in the afternoon of Ashura. In such processions, often certain symbolic objects are carried by the mourners, particularly alam (lit. 'flag'), which signifies the ensign of Husayn at Karbala carried by his brother Abbas ibn Ali. Nakhl (lit. 'date palm') is another such symbol—carried in a nakhl-gardani procession—signifying the bier of Husayn in Karbala, which was made of date palms, according to a legend. Indian processions carry replicas of Husayn's bier or tomb, called ta'ziya, which shares the same name with the theatrical reenactments of Karbala in Iran. The Ta'ziya is finally buried or submerged, submersion probably being a Hindu influence. Similar processions take place in Trinidad as part of the annual Hosay commemoration, in which tadjah is the local equivalent of ta'ziya.

== Non-Shia rituals ==
The slaughter of Muhammad's grandson and his relatives shocked the whole Muslim community at the time, and Karbala has been commemorated by some Sunni Muslims ever since, for instance in South Asia, albeit these Sunni rituals may differ from their Shia counterparts. The Sunni remembrance of Karbala, however, has declined in recent times. Indeed, for many other Sunnis, Ashura is instead an important festival in commemoration of the parting of the Red Sea by Moses. It is viewed as a day of thanksgiving (shukr), a joyous occasion, celebrated through pious acts and acceptable expressions of delight. In the Maghreb, for instance, Ashura is celebrated today through fasting, almsgiving, honoring the dead, special dishes, jumping over bonfires, and carnivals. Muharram rituals also appear in Sufism, but therein Karbala is less of a tragedy, but rather the celebration of the eternal life of Husayn and his companions, who annihilated themselves in the Divine with their voluntary deaths.

== Significance ==
=== Karbala paradigm ===
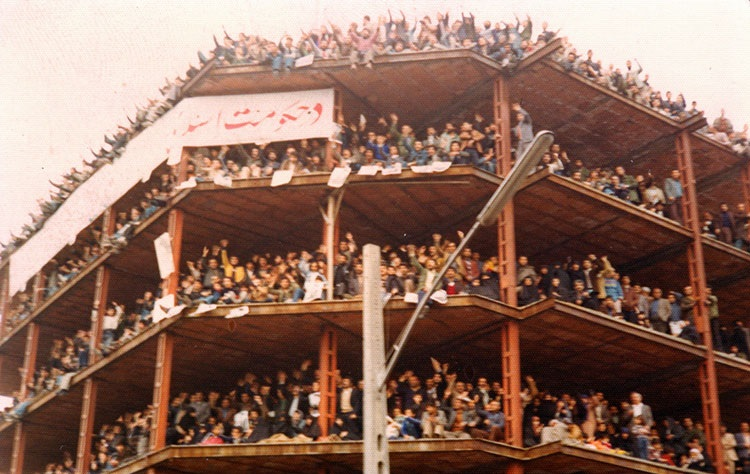
Ashura demonstrations against the Pahlavids in Iran, 1978

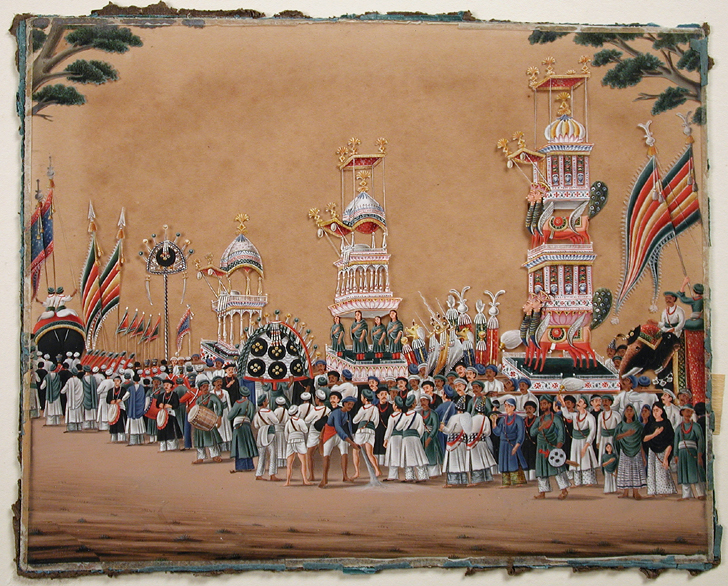
Some have criticized the pageantry of mourning processions. The one painted above is dated circa 1850.

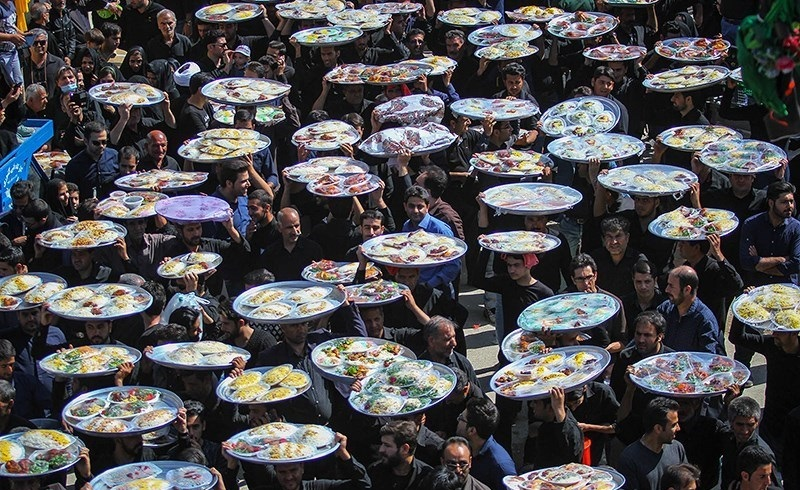
Distribution of free meals during Muharram, often to fulfil religious vows

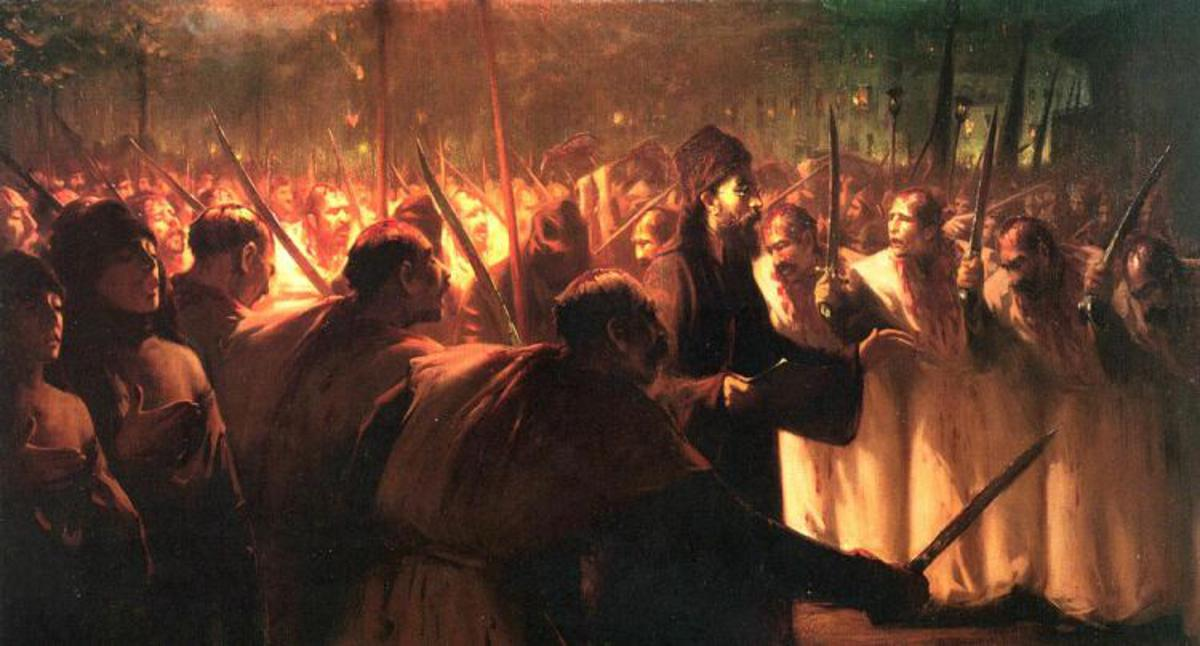
Self-flagellation with swords in Turkey, dated Ashura 1909

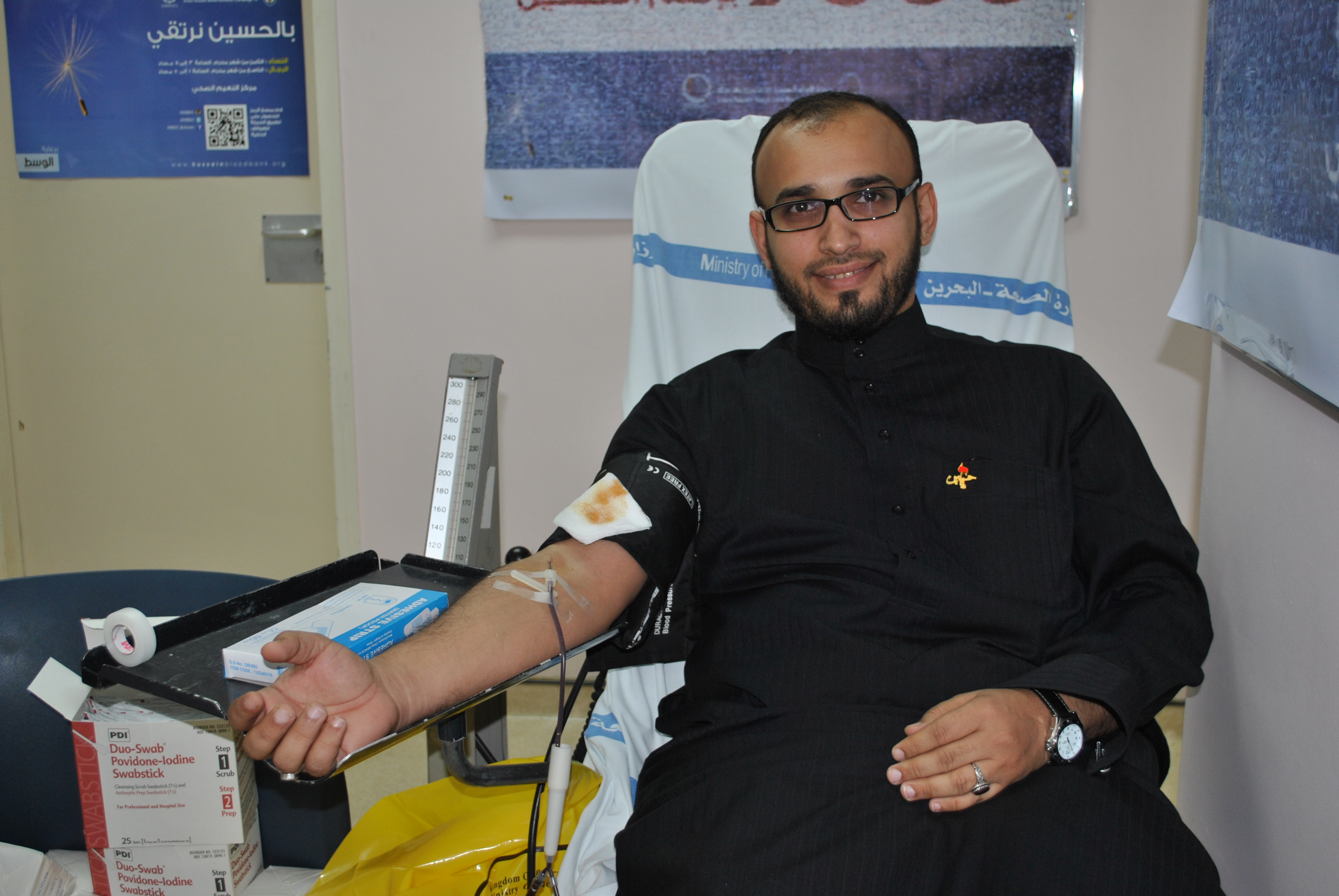
Donating blood in Bahrain as an alternative to extreme self-flagellation

In Shia Islam, the Battle of Karbala symbolizes the eternal struggle between good and evil, where Husayn is viewed as the exemplar of piety, sacrifice, and perseverance, while Yazid represents injustice, tyranny, and corruption. The fate of Husayn, the third Shia imam, is regarded in Shi'ism as the acme of human suffering and self-sacrifice, the wrong committed against him so grievous that its repercussions continue, generation after generation, until the eschatological uprising of Muhammad al-Mahdi, the last imam in Twelver Shi'ism, who is thought to be in occultation since 874. Indeed, the victory of Yazid in Karbala is regarded in Shi'ism as the ultimate sabotage of Muhammad's prophetic mission, the sabotage that began much earlier with the appointment of Abu Bakr, instead of Ali ibn Abi Talib, to succeed Muhammad, hence the saying, "Husayn was killed on the day of the Saqifa." In Shia view, the preordained but voluntary uprising and sacrifice of Husayn thus preserved the true Islam for future generations, as it awakened the Muslim community to its moral depravity under the Umayyads. In return for his suffering, according to the Shia, Husayn was rewarded the divine prerogative of intercession on Day of Judgement for those followers who share in his pain.

For Shias, mourning for Husayn is a means of remembering his suffering, an act of protest against oppression, a struggle for God (jihad), and as such an act of worship. As an act of worship, mourning for Husayn is viewed as redemptive, through which Shias seek atonement for their sins and the sins of all mankind. By sharing in his pain, they also hope to benefit from the intercession of Husayn on the Day of Judgement. Indeed, numerous traditions, attributed to Shia imams, count the divine rewards of mourning for Husayn, particularly weeping for him. As an act of protest, on the other hand, mourning rituals parallel armed struggle which was often not an option for the Shia minority under oppressive regimes. In recent times, Muharram rituals have increasingly developed a political dimension, as preachers compare oppressors now to the enemies of Husayn in Karbala. However, while Karbala indeed provided the Shia with a model for righteous struggle against injustice and oppression, this blueprint has not always translated into action, as most Shia imams were themselves political quietists who lived under oppressive regimes. Muharram rituals also help define and strengthen the Shia identity, and the Karbala paradigm remains an integral part of Shia historical memory, theological understanding, and religious identity. Husayn's martyrdom is often linked to the hagiography of John the Baptist.

=== Criticism of Muharram rituals ===
The colorful and emotional Muharram rituals of the Shia are condemned by Sunni scholars, possibly because of the Sunni emphasis on "puritanical piety and sobriety." A Sunni hadith, attributed to Muhammad, reports that he profusely wept for the death of his infant son Ibrahim but forbade mourners from saying anything that would "irritate the Lord." However, there is also another version of the same hadith in Sunni sources, according to which Muhammad forbade raising one's voice in times of misfortune, or mutilating one's face, or tearing one's clothes. By contrast, the Shia imam Ali ibn Husayn Zayn al-Abidin (d. 713) is known in Shi'ism for the intensity of his life-long grief over Karbala. The only surviving son of Husayn, Zayn al-Abidin was too sick to fight in the Battle of Karbala. He justified his many years of mourning by citing the Quranic story of Joseph, which describes how his father Jacob mourned his absence to the point that he lost his eyesight. Whatever the case, wailing and striking one's face or chest in grief are ancient Arab traditions for mourning the dead. Others have criticized mourning gatherings, suggesting that their resources should be directed towards the poor. In turn, proponents of Muharram rituals argue that feeding the poor is part of the Karbala culture, usually to fulfill religious vows (nadhr) made by devotees. The supporters add that displays of generosity are more common during the months of mourning.

=== Extreme self-flagellation ===
Forms of self-flagellation that involve bloodshed are often controversial among the Shia, and have been condemned by many Shia clerics. Through such practices, participants argue that they experience a fraction of the pain inflicted at Karbala, show their willingness to self-sacrifice, and atone for the sins of those Kufans who deserted Husayn. Opponents respond that self-harm is forbidden in Islam, that the spilt blood renders the body impure (najis) for daily prayers, and that such practices project a negative image of Shi'ism. Unlike mild forms of self-flagellation, extreme self-mortification has no precedent in early Islam, neither does it appear in the Quran. In turn, supporters contend that these acts show their love for the House of Muhammad, made obligatory upon all Muslims in verse 42:23 of the Quran. Despite the criticism, the Shia populace, at least in South Asia, seems reluctant to prevent such practices, either to defy Sunni criticism, or to boost popular support for Muharram rituals among the Shia. Elsewhere, bloody self-flagellation is outlawed in Iran and Lebanon, where donating blood is encouraged as an alternative.

== History of Muharram rituals ==
=== Umayyads (r. 661–750) ===
Commemoration of Karbala began shortly after the battle with its female survivors, including Husayn's sister Zaynab. While in captivity in Damascus, or later when they visited Karbala on their way back to Medina from Damascus, the bereaved women held the earliest mourning gathering (majlis), in which they recounted the tragedy, shed tears, and struck their faces (latm) in grief. Such instances of self-flagellation, striking one's face or chest, were already ancient Arab traditions for mourning the dead. For years, Zayn al-Abidin and his sister Sakina (d. 735) may have continued to annually organize such mourning gatherings, which also featured Karbala elegies (nawha). Alternatively, the first annual commemoration and the first pilgrimage may be attributed to Tawwabun, that is, those Kufans who regretted deserting Husayn in Karbala: They are said to have gathered at his grave site on the first anniversary of his death, where they mourned his loss and recited elegies. They also promised to unite and rise against the Umayyads, which they did in what became known as the Tawwabun uprising of 685. Indeed, Karbala united the nascent Shia community, the roots of which likely formed in the lifetime of the Islamic prophet Muhammad. After Karbala, this community crystallized into a distinct sect that regards Shia imams, that is, Husayn and certain other descendants of Muhammad, as his rightful religious and temporal successors.

Risking the Umayyads' wrath, the commemoration of Karbala continued in similar small and private gatherings, held, for instance, at the houses of the Shia imams, who also frequently encouraged the Shia community to follow suit. Similarly, pilgrimage to Karbala remained limited and precarious in this period. The imams also saw poetry as a vehicle to preserve and spread the ideals of Karbala. In particular, the Shia imam Ja'far Sadiq (d. 765) is said to have regularly hosted poets who composed and recited Karbala elegies. Indeed, the Umayyads actively worked to erase the memory of Karbala, as written accounts of the Battle of Karbala are absent from the literary corpus of this period. Probably in the same vein, the Umayyad general al-Hajjaj ibn Yusuf (d. c. 714) declared Ashura a festive public holiday. Nevertheless, the anger against the Umayyads for Karbala was in part responsible for their fall.

=== Abbasids (r. 750–1258) ===
The Abbasids, who claimed descent from Muhammad's uncle Abbas, rallied the Shia support to overthrow the Umayyads, promising them a leader from the House of Muhammad, whom many Shias probably imagined to be an Alid, that is, a descendant of Muhammad through his only surviving daughter Fatima and his son-in-law Ali ibn Abi Talib, the first Shia imam. Karbala was thus heavily featured in the anti-Umayyad polemics of the Abbasids. As a result, the commemoration of Karbala surged in the form of literary accounts and pilgrimages. Such pilgrimages were also highly encouraged by the Shia imams, including al-Sadiq. In the early Abbasid period, commemorations of Karbala were even held publicly in mosques. After assuming power, however, the Abbasids gradually turned against the Shia, many of whom were disillusioned with Abbasid, rather than Alid, caliphs. Insofar as Shia Muharram rituals promoted Alids as the legitimate leaders, the Abbasids also came to view such practices as a political threat. For instance, the Abbasid caliph al-Mutawakkil (r. 847–861) demolished the shrine of Husayn and punished pilgrimage with death. To prevent another Karbala, the Abbasids also kept the Shia imams under surveillance, and at times imprisoned, tortured, or killed them.

=== Buyids (r. 934–1062) ===
The first public Karbala processions happened under Buyids, the Shia dynasty that ruled parts of Iraq and Iran, after the collapse of the central Abbasid caliphate. On Ashura 963, during the reign of the first Buyid ruler Mu'izz al-Dawla (r. 945–967), markets were closed in Baghdad, Iraq, and processions of black-garbed Shia mourners marched in the streets, weeping, wailing, and striking their faces and chests. Such processions provoked violent Sunni riots and counter-processions, which involved, for instance, reenactments of the Battle of the Camel in 656 against Ali ibn Abi Talib. Mourning processions also appeared under the Hamdanids in Syria and the Fatimids in Egypt, two other Shia states. In Cairo, Egypt, however, deadly Sunni riots apparently discontinued the Shia processions during the reign of the Fatimid caliph al-Mu'izz li-Din Allah (r. 953–975). Back in Iraq, dedicated buildings for Karbala gatherings can also be traced back to the Buyid period.

=== Safavids (r. 1576 – c. 1736) ===
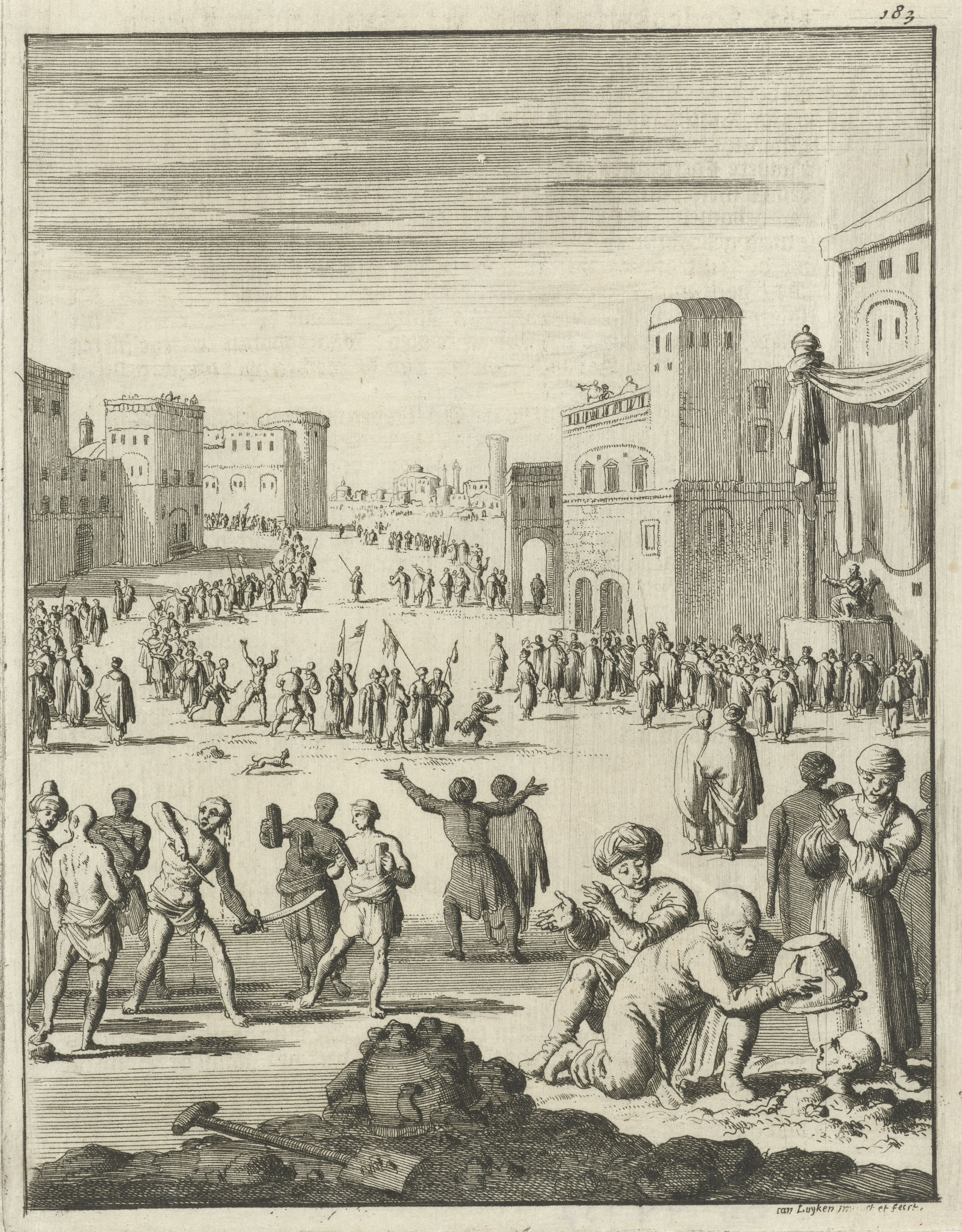
Mourning rituals in Iran, dated 1682

Muharram rituals had reached Iran as early as the twelfth century, but a new era began with the Safavid dynasty, whose founder Ismai'l I (r. 1501–1524) is responsible for the wholesale conversion of Iran to Twelver Shi'ism. This transition was met with relatively little resistance locally, perhaps due to the popularity of Sufi orders in Iran. Muharram rituals also helped spread Shia Islam inside Iran. Over time, these rituals grew more elaborate artistically, where Shias freely expressed their identity without the threat of a Sunni majority. For instance, participants openly condemned (la'n) the first three caliphs–Abu Bakr, Umar, and Uthman–who are viewed in Shi'ism as the usurpers of the right of Ali ibn Abi Talib to succeed Muhammad.

In the Safavid era, annual mourning gatherings (majalis) were held on the first ten days of Muharram in Husainiyyas, a term coined in this period for buildings dedicated to ritual mourning. In such gatherings, narratives of Karbala were emotionally recounted in the ritual of rawza-khwani, which owes its name to the 1502–1503 book Rawzat al-shuhada, perhaps the most famous collection of Karbala narratives to date. The recitation of the book was later abandoned as trained story-tellers relied on their creative skills to conjure up the narratives. Other notable Safavid rituals were Muharram processions and self-flagellation, such as sina-zani (striking the chest), zanjir-zani (striking the back with chains), and tiq-zani or qama-zani (mortifying oneself with swords or knives). The extreme acts of self-flagellation were new practices, as there is no evidence of self-inflicted bloodshed in early historical sources. Such rituals likely originated in Turkish-speaking regions of Caucasus and Azerbayjan in Northern Iran, introduced into Shi'ism by the Qizilbash, who formed the backbone of the Safavid military and were regarded as Ghulat because of their exaggerated veneration for the Shia imams. In turn, extreme self-flagellation had perhaps reached these regions from Europe, where it was practiced by some Christians as a form of atonement.

A major development in this period was the appearance of theatrical representations of Karbala narratives, known as ta'ziya or shabih-khwani. Such theatrical reenactments were likely a natural outgrowth of the verbal reenactments in rawza-khwani, and were rooted in pre-Islamic Iranian heritage, such as the epic poem Ayadgar-i Zariran and the legend of Siyavash, or perhaps the dramatic reenactments of Karbala were inspired by the Christian Corpus Christi processions. At any rate, these performances were popular, often sponsored by the Safavid royals and other elites, and even attended by the Safavid monarchs. The new ritual was also approved by some Safavid scholars, such as the prominent Twelver jurist Majlisi (d. 1699), while independent Shia clerics were initially critical of the performances, partly for their personification of a Shia imam. From Iran, ta'ziya later reached Iraq and then Lebanon, but had limited success in the former.

=== Modern times ===
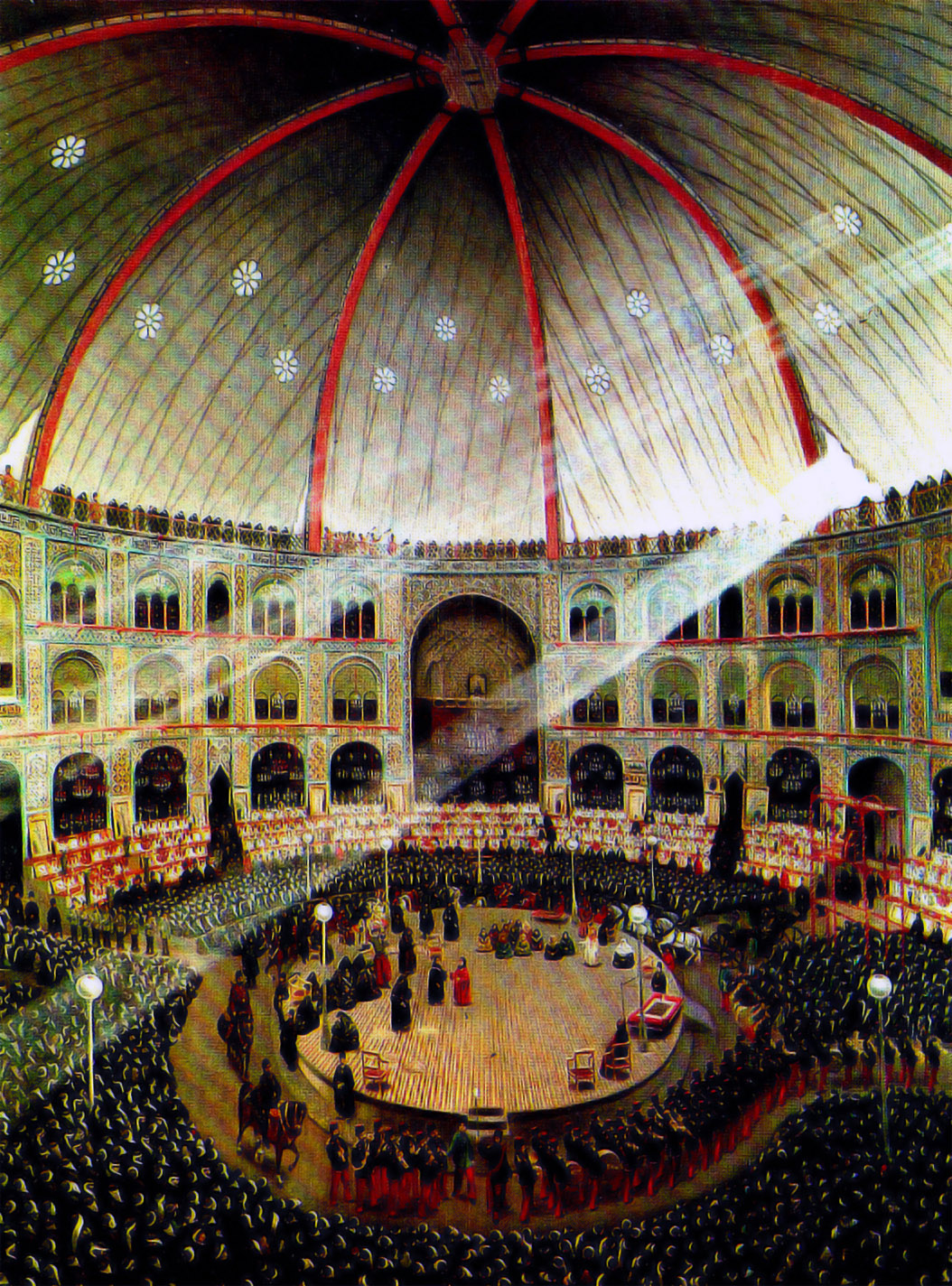
Takia Dawlat in a painting by Kamal-ol-molk, dated 1892

In Iran, the ritual condemnation of the first three caliphs was discontinued after the Safavids. As early as the Qajar period (r. 1789–1925), Iranian rituals also extended to the month of Safar, due to the commemoration of Arbai'n, which marks forty days after the death of Husayn. Also in the Qajar era, the theatrical reenactment of Karbala (ta'ziya) reached its peak. In the Qajar capital Tehran, the most elaborate shows took place in Takia Dawlat, built by the Qajar monarch Naser al-Din Shah (r. 1848–1896).

Ta'ziya fell into a slow decline in Iran afterward, to the point that it became a rarity in large cities by the 1940s under the Pahlavis (r. 1925–1979). Besides the emergence of new art mediums, the decline in ta'ziya can be partly explained by Pahlavi bans and restrictions, as part of their program to modernize Iran. The modernization was likely a guise, however, for the Pahlavis probably saw Muharram rituals as a political threat. Indeed, as early as the 1909 constitutional revolution in Iran, mourning gatherings had assumed a political dimension as preachers compared Iranian oppressors to the enemies of Husayn in Karbala. Eventually, the Pahlavis were toppled in the Iranian Revolution (1978–1979) through the continued efforts of dissidents, such as Ali Shariati (d. 1977), who effectively used Karbala symbols and rituals against the regime. Favoring the Sunni community, the Iraqi president Saddam Hussein (d. 2006) also banned Muharram rituals, but they resumed shortly after he was deposed in 2003. In Saudi Arabia, such rituals have been banned since Ibn Saud reimposed Wahhabi rule over the country, although the ban has been defied at times by the discontented Shia minority, protesting what they perceive as Saudi discrimination. In Lebanon, Muharram rituals show Iranian roots and were restrained until about the mid nineteenth century. Later, Karbala symbolism was used there effectively against the Israeli occupation (1985–2000). Extreme forms of self-flagellation have also been banned in Iran and the Hezbollah party of Lebanon since the mid-90s.

=== South Asia ===
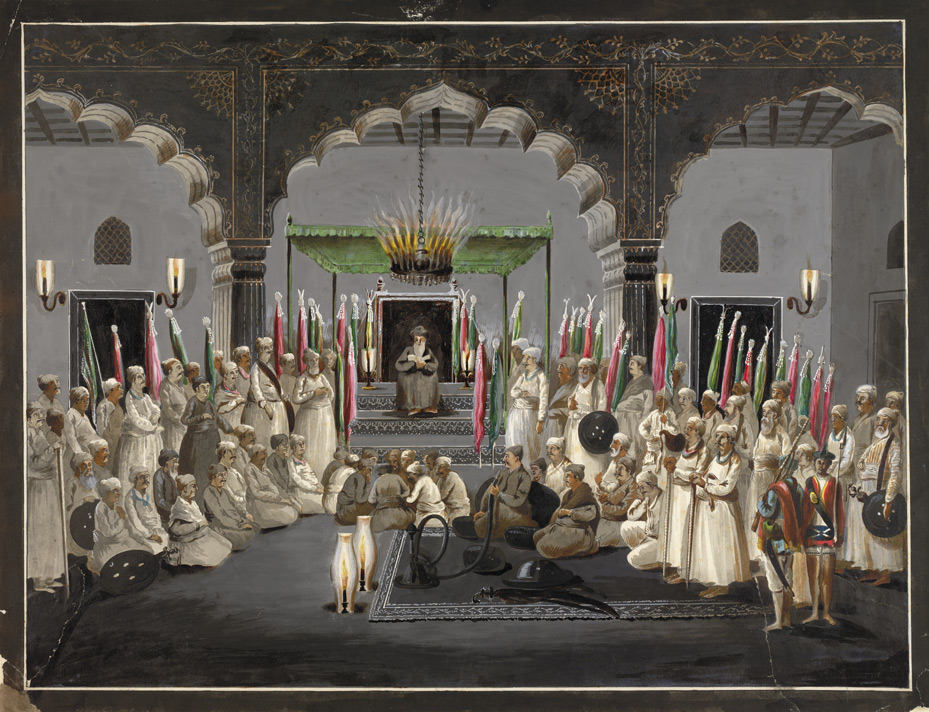
Mourning gathering in Awadh, India, circa 1795

From Iraq and Iran, Muharram rituals, such as rawza-khwani, eventually reached parts of South Asia. The rituals were perhaps introduced there by Timur (d. 1405), the founder of the Timurid Empire (r. 1370–1507), or perhaps through the migration of some Iranian elites to South Asia. Muharram rituals were later suppressed by the Mughals (r. 1526–1857) from the sixteenth century onward, but reemerged when the Mughals weakened in the eighteenth century, for instance, in Awadh under the patronage of its Shia ruler Saadat Ali Khan I (d. 1739). In particular, the Shia rulers of Awadh sponsored Mirza Dabeer (d. 1875) and Mir Anees (d. 1874), two prominent Karbala elegy composers in Urdu literature. Perhaps also influenced by Iraq and Iran, there were dedicated buildings for Muharram rituals in South Asia by the end of the sixteenth century, known variously as imambarah, imambaragh, azakhana, Ashurakhana, and ta'ziyakhana. These rituals even found their way to Trinidad when Indian immigrants settled there in the nineteenth century. Influenced by local carnivals, however, Muharram rituals lost their mourning tone there. This annual Hosay commemoration has survived to this day.

== Gallery ==
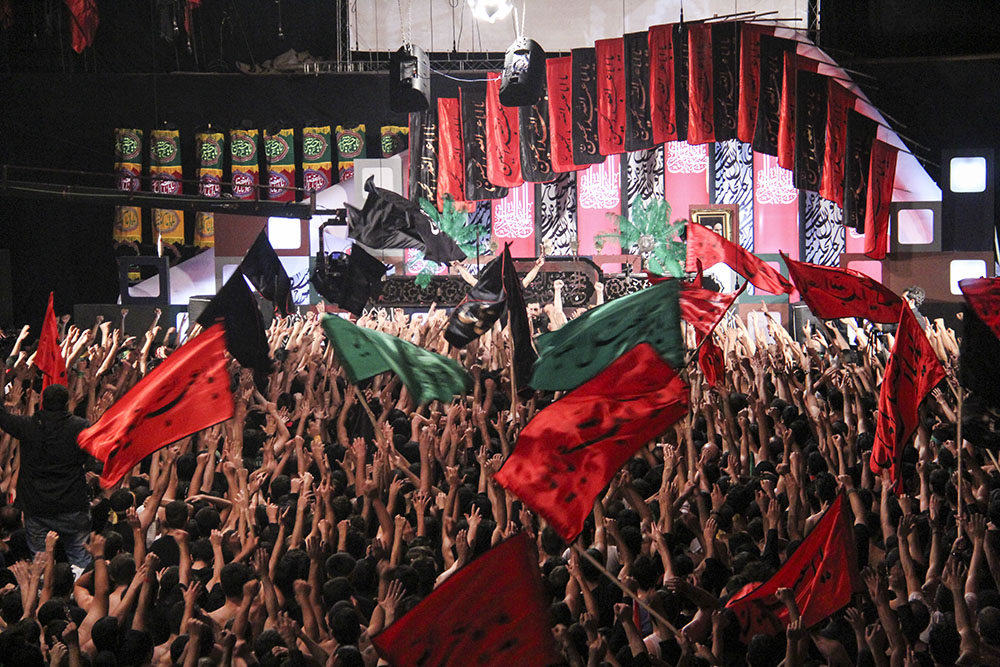
Muharram mourning gathering (majlis) in Iran

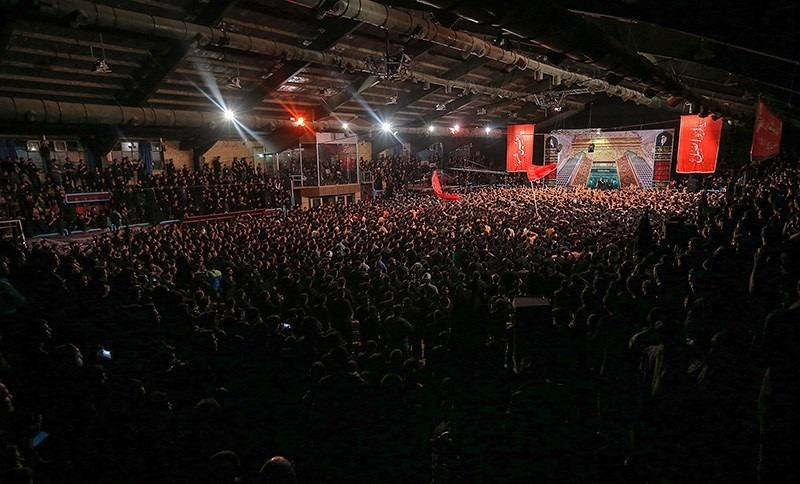
Majlis in Iran

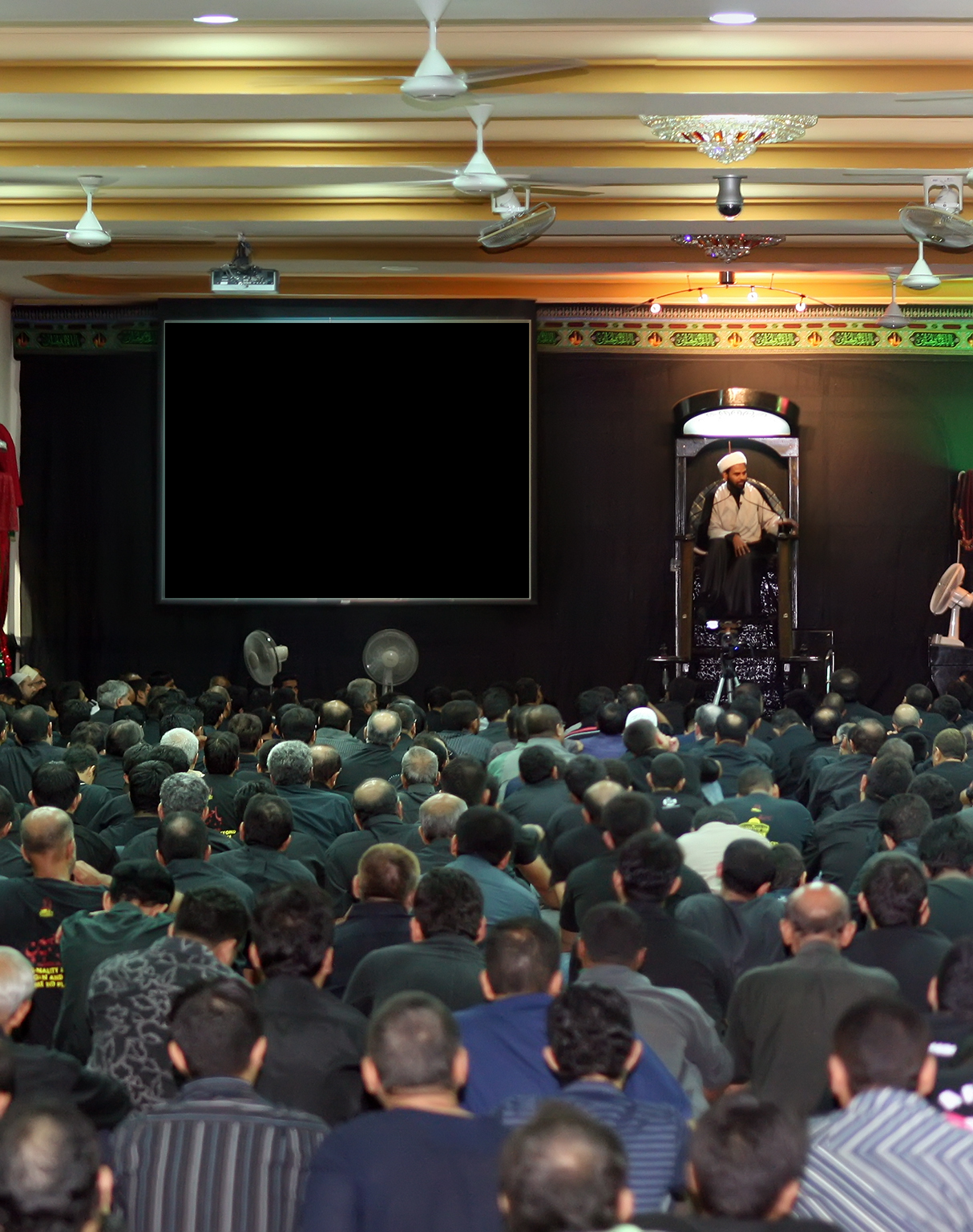
Majlis in Tanzania

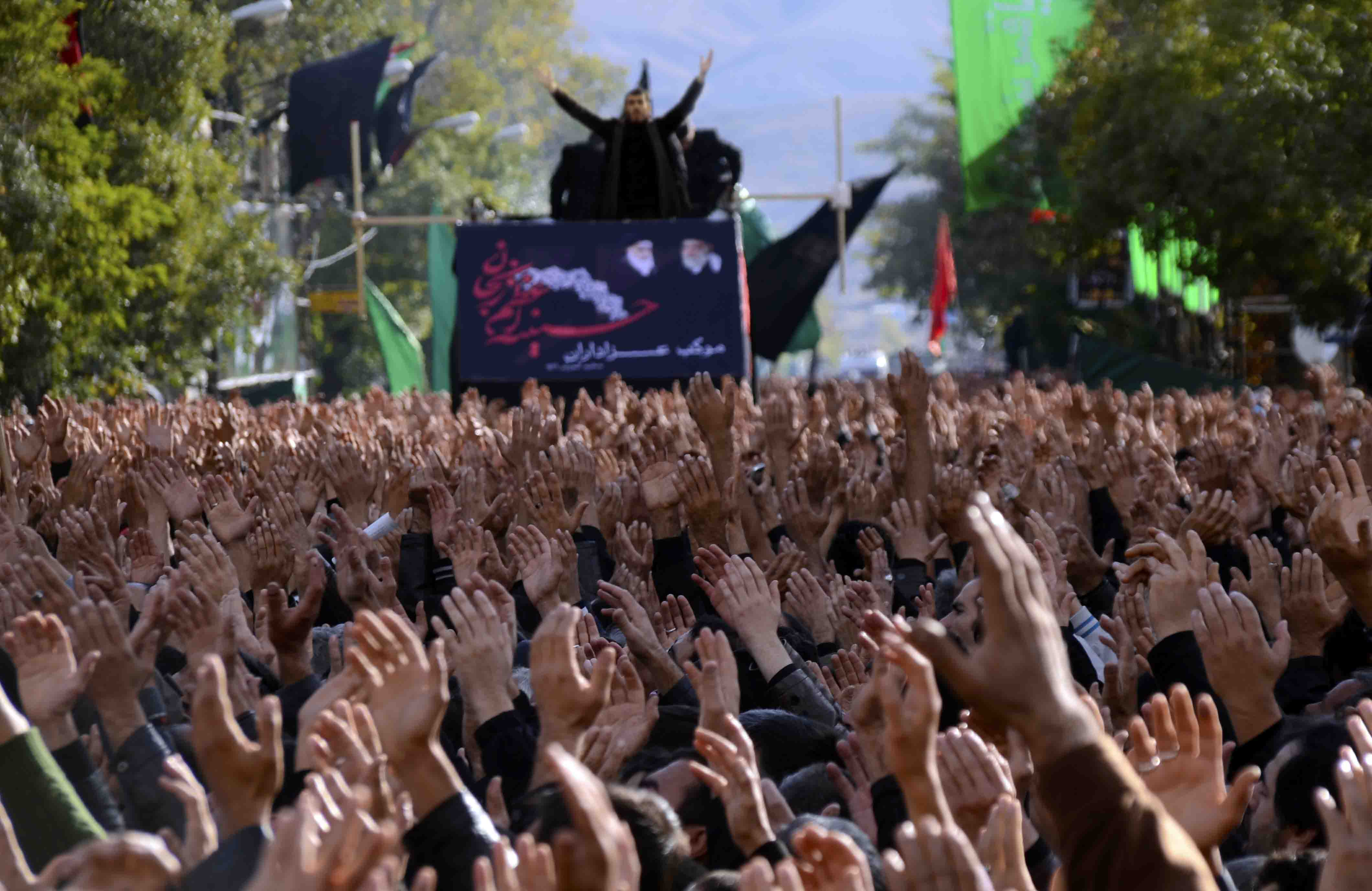
Muharram mourning procession in Iran

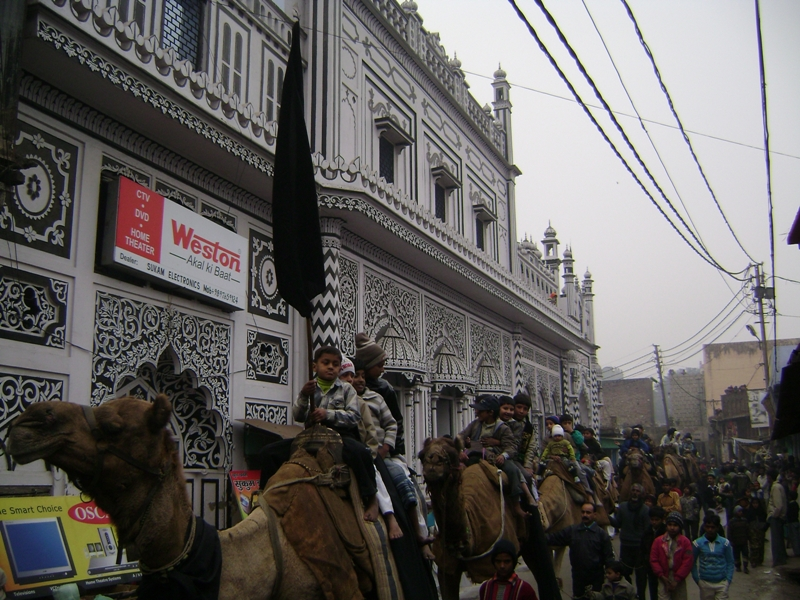
Muharram procession in India, with an azakhana in the background

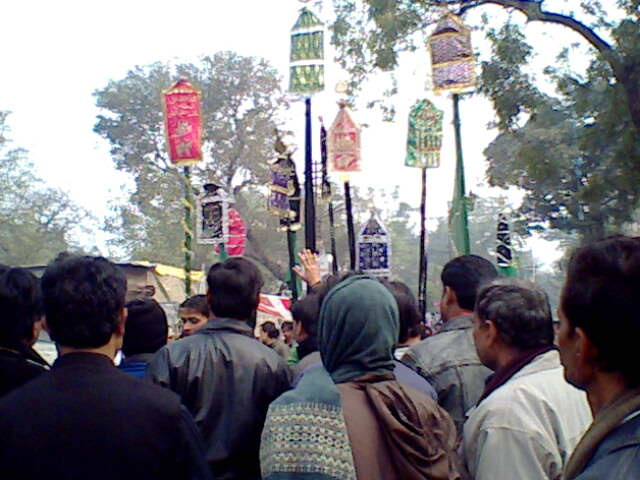
Muharram procession in India carrying alams that symbolize the ensign of Husayn

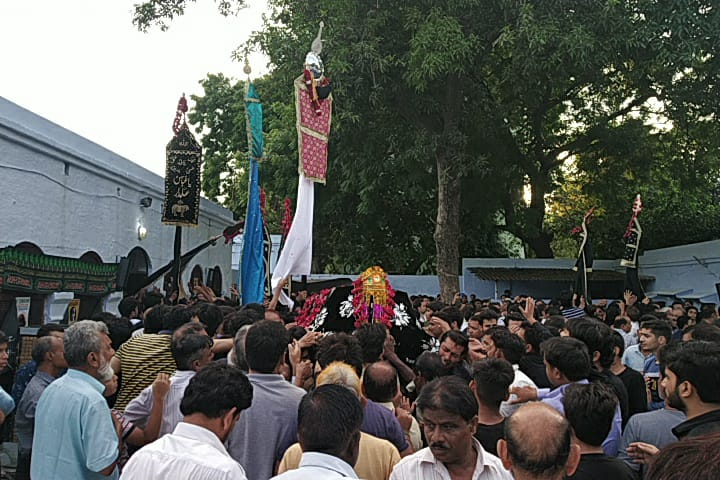
Muharram procession in India

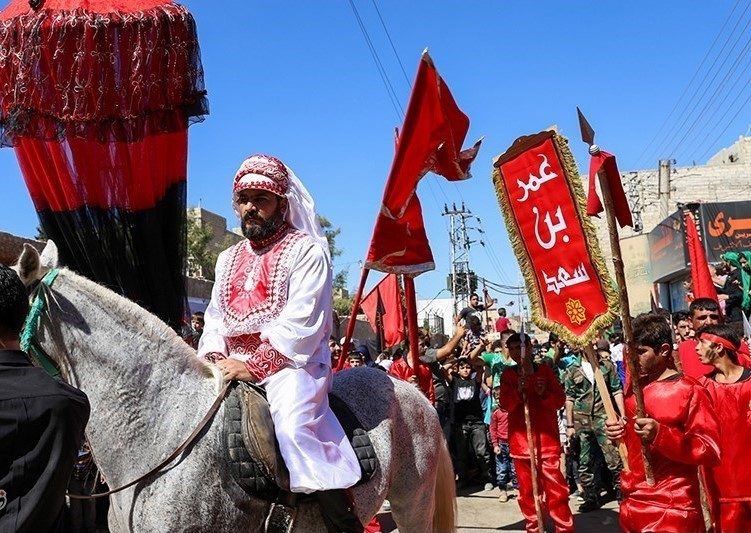
Muharram procession in Syria

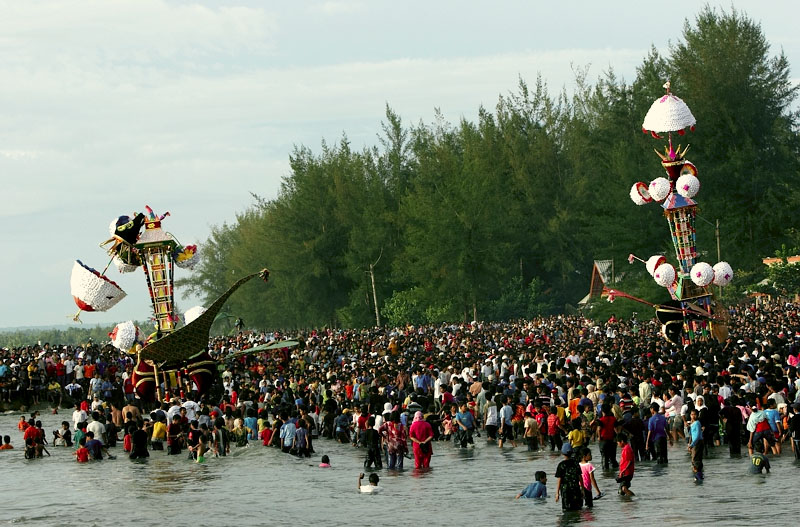
Submerging tabuiks in Indonesia in a mock funeral of Husayn

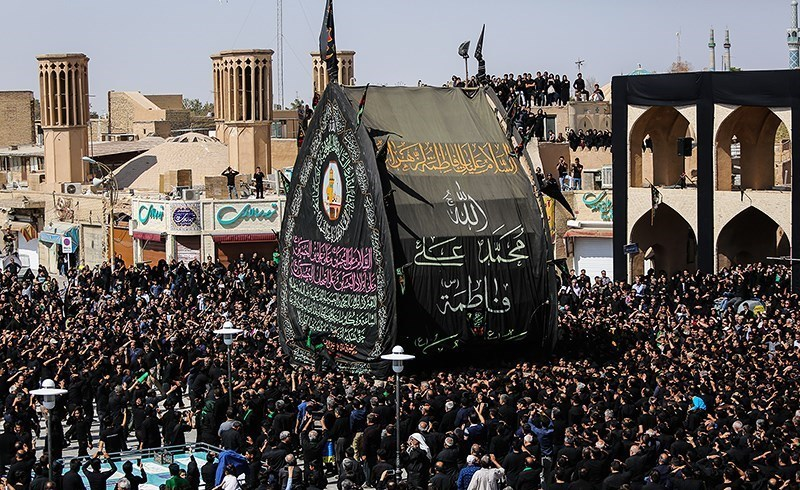
A symbolic bier of Husayn (nakhl) in a mock funeral (nakhl-gardani) in Iran

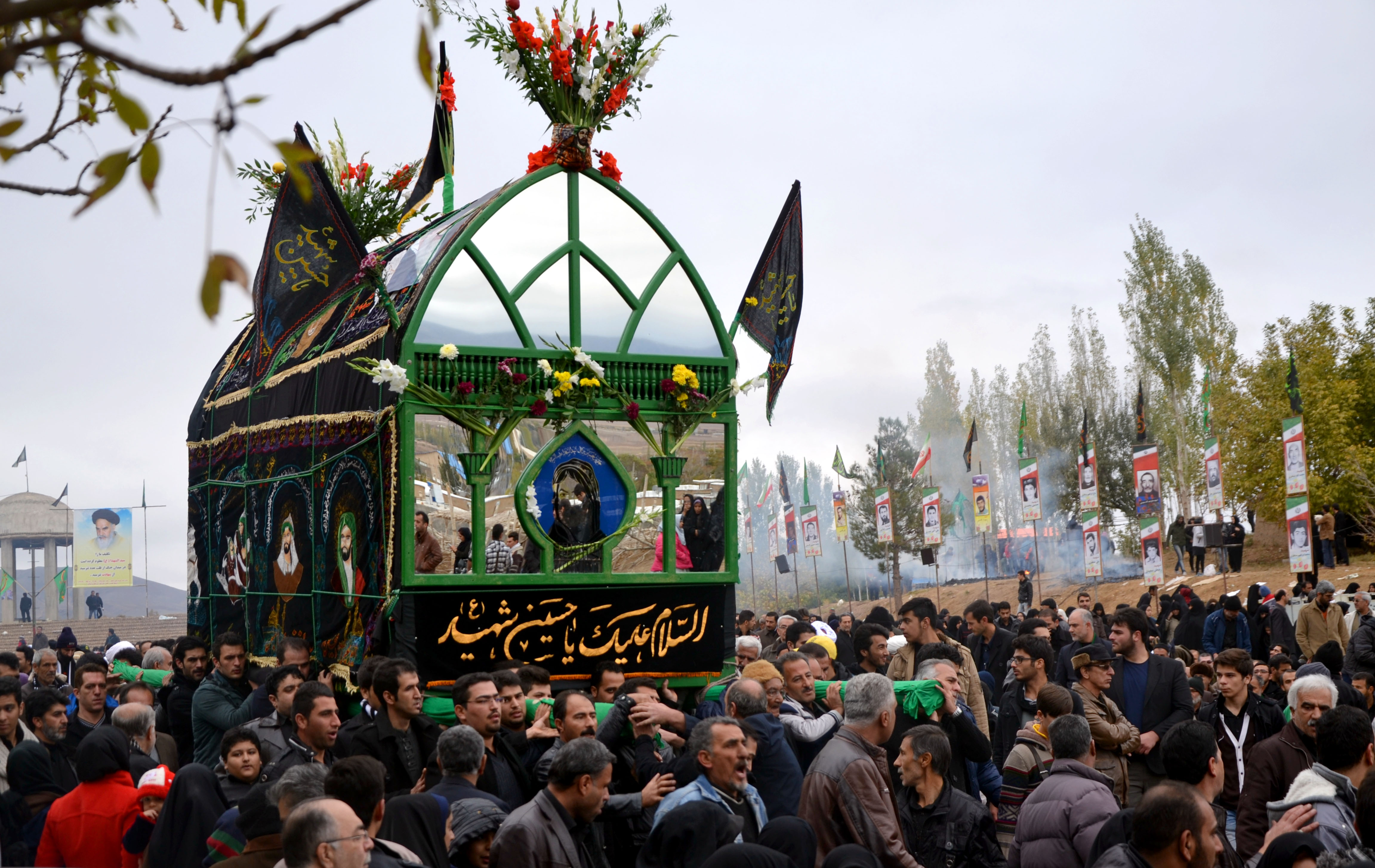
Nakhl-gardani in Iran

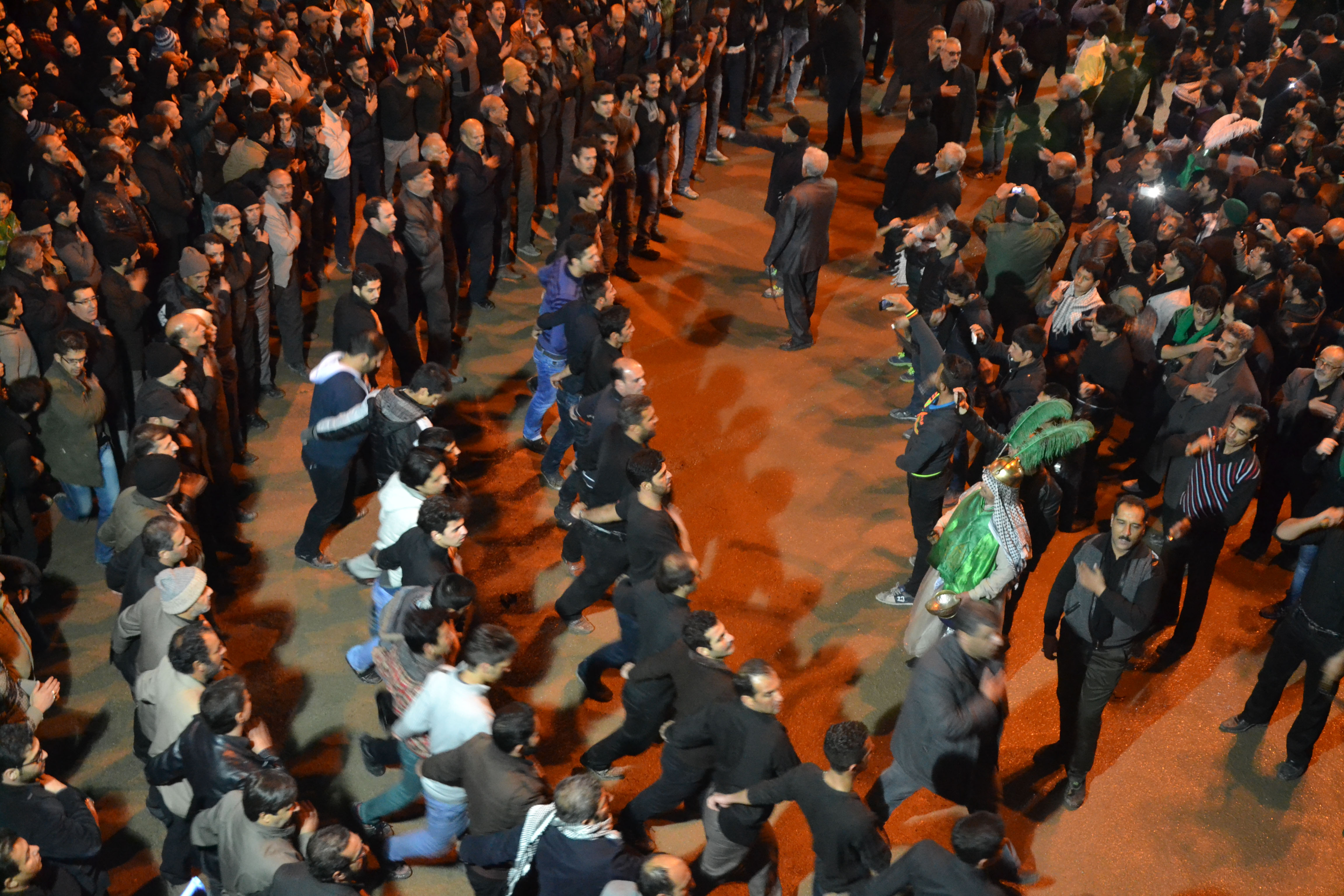
Moving in a circle, mourners strike their chests (sina-zani) in Iran

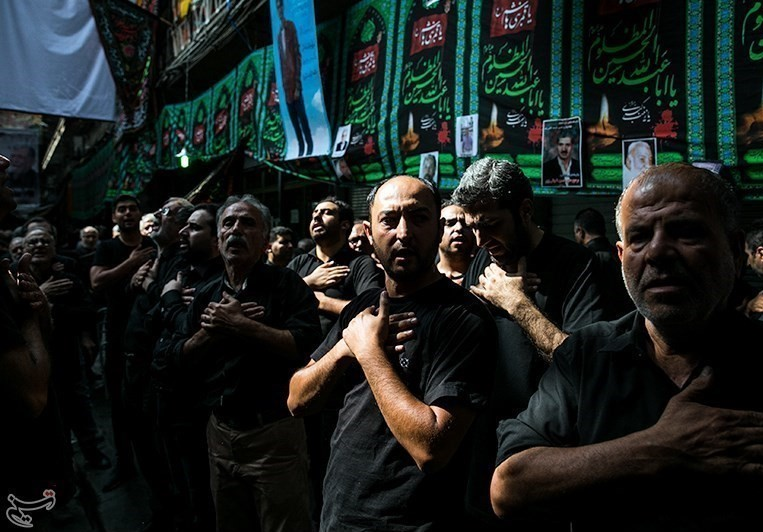
Sina-zani in Iran

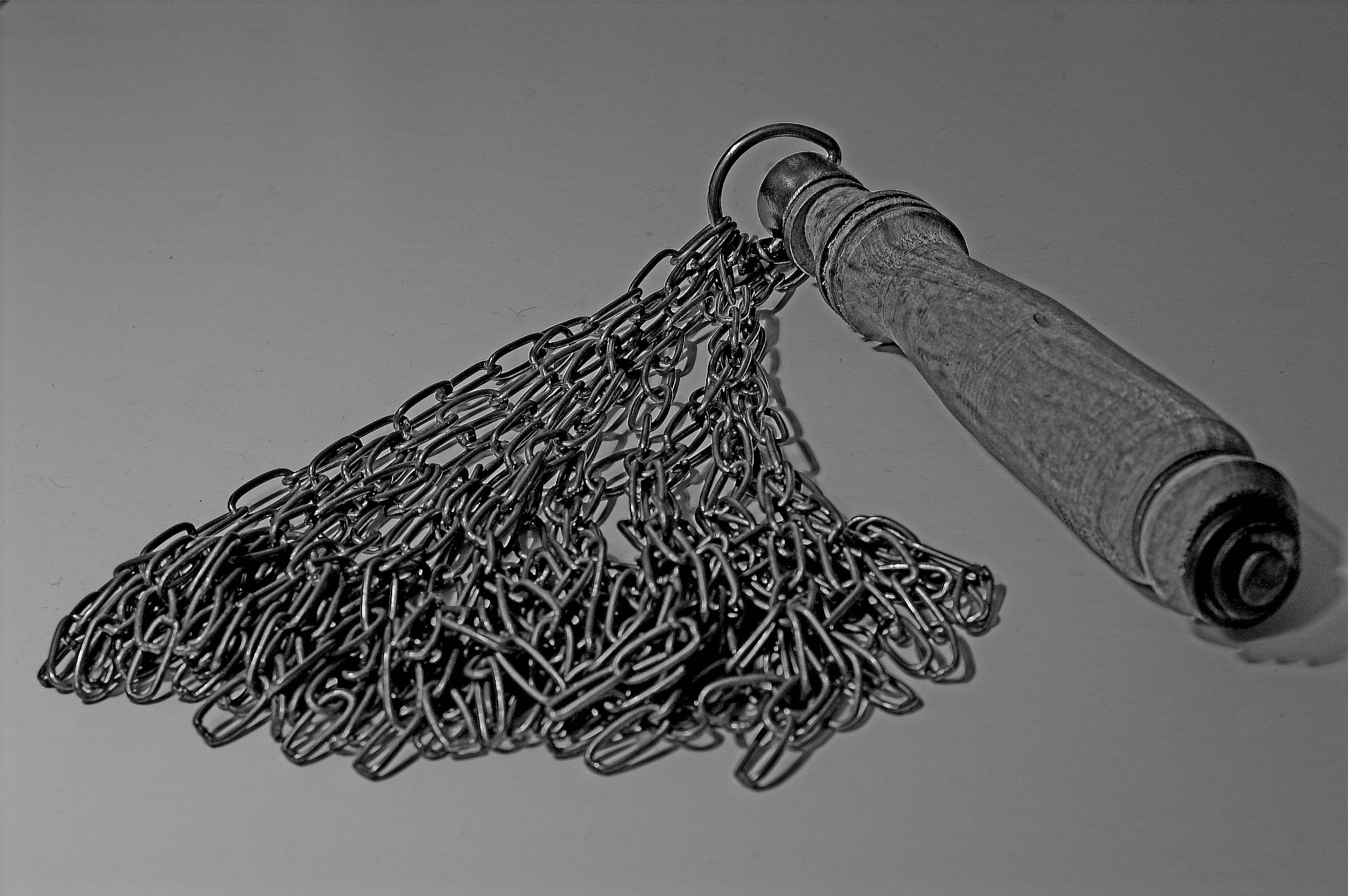
Chains used in self-flagellation (zanjir-zani)

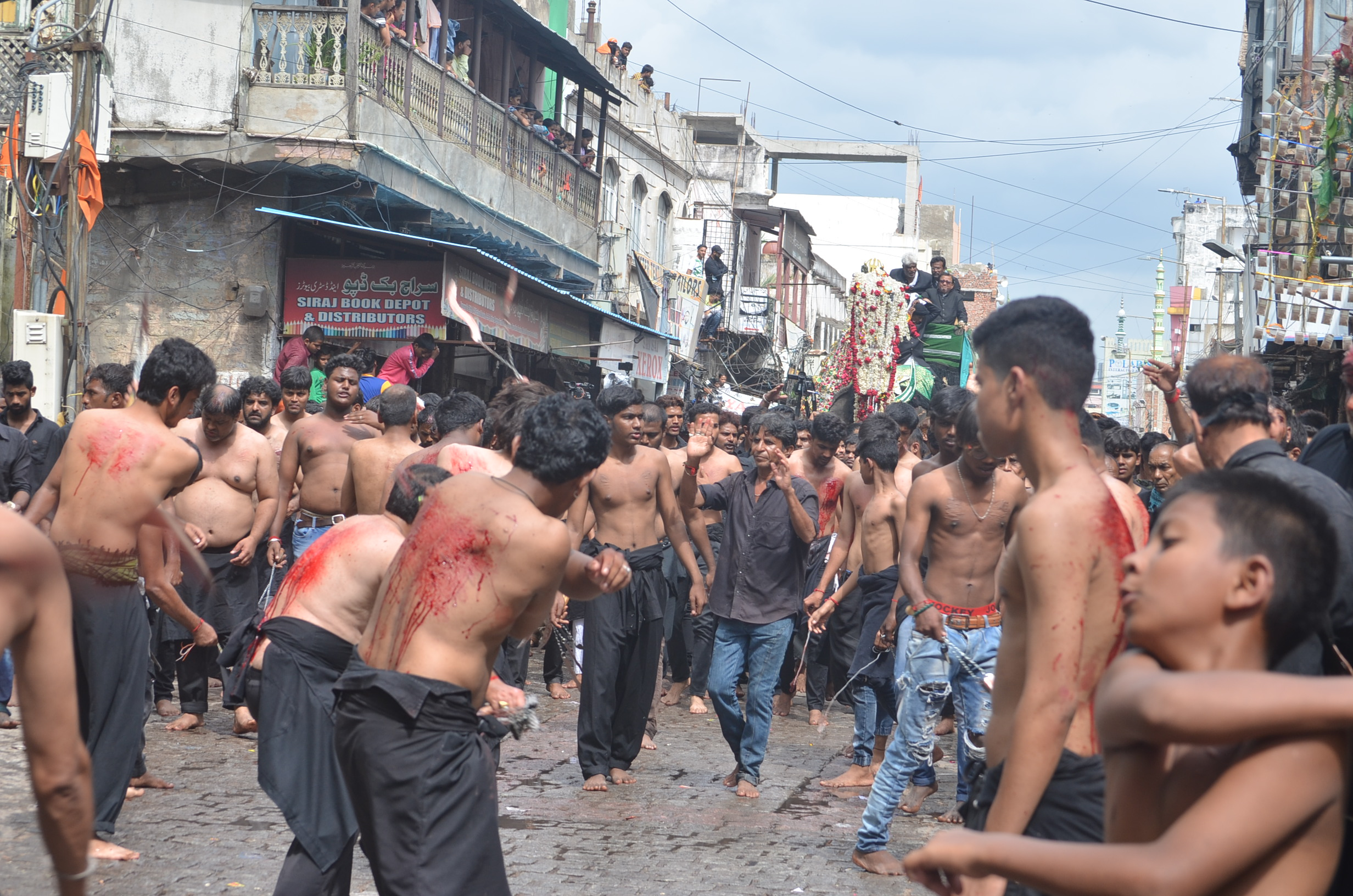
Extreme self-flagellation in a Muharram procession in India

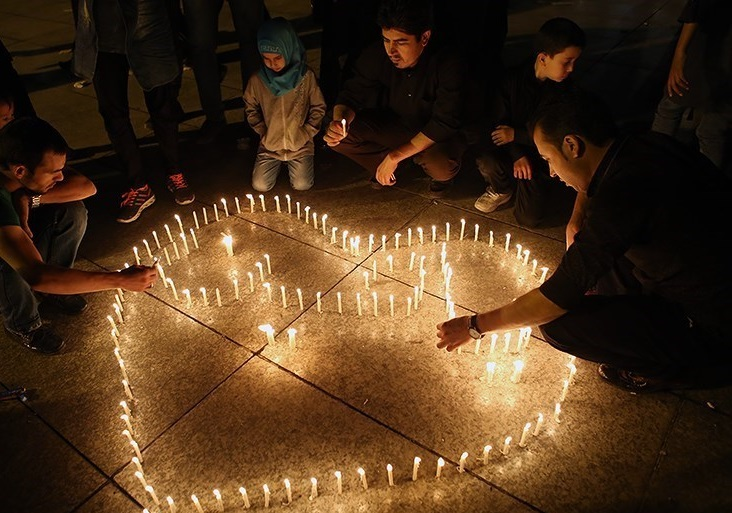
Night of Ashura in Iran

== See also ==
- Ashura
- Tazia
- Ta'ziyeh
- Chup Tazia
- Muharram Rebellion
- Husayniyya
- Hussaini Dalan
- Arba'in
- Holy Week, a Christian analog
- List of the terrorist attacks on Shia mourners
- Azadari in Lucknow
- Ziyarat Ashura
- Alam (Muharram rituals)
