= List of terrorist attacks against Shia mourners during Muharram =

The List of terrorist actions against the Mourning of Muharram contains actions such as killing, bombing, physically harming, or otherwise attacking Shia Muslims holding the Mourning of Muharram.

== List of actions ==
The following is a list of terrorist incidents and arrests.

Country	Date	Article	Description	Dead	Injured	Status
Iraq	March 2007	2007 Al Hillah bombings	On 6 March 2007, nearly 200 people were killed and 115 were wounded in suicide bomb attacks on Shia pilgrims who headed to the city of Kerbala to commemorate a religious event in Hilla, Iraq.	200	115	
Iran	April 2008	2008 Shiraz explosion	On 12 April 2008, Fourteen people were killed and 202 were injured by bombing an explosion that happened during prayers at the Hussainiya Seyed al-Shohada Mosque in the southern Iranian city of Shiraz.	14	202	
Iran	December 2010	2010 Chabahar suicide bombing	On 14 December 2010, 41 people were killed and 100 were wounded in suicide bomb attacks on crowded Shia Muslim mourning procession in the southeastern Iranian coastal city of Chabahar, outside Imam Hussain Mosque.	41	100	
Iraq	January 2011	January 2011 Iraq suicide attacks	On 19 January 2011, during a suicide bombing Ghalbiyah, two people killed and injured 15 out of a crowd marching from Baghdad to Karbala.	2	15	
Iraq	January 2011	January 2011 Iraq suicide attacks	On 20 January 2011, at least 56 people were killed by two car bombs detonation near Karbala and 3 people were killed in Baquba during the holy commemorates of Arbaeen.	59		
Iraq	January 2011	24 January 2011 Iraq bombings	On 24 January 2011 in car bombs detonation incident a few hours apart, along the path of the Arbaeen Pilgrimage and a bus terminal to the east of Karbala, 25 people were killed and nearly 14 wounded.	25	14	
Iraq	June 2014	Camp Speicher massacre	On 12 June 2014, ISIL killed at least 1,566 Shia Iraqi Air Force cadets in an attack on Camp Speicher in Tikrit. At the time of the attack there were between 4,000 and 11,000 unarmed cadets in the camp. This is the second deadliest terrorist attack in history and the deadliest attack conducted by ISIL.	1,566–1,700	Unknown	In retaliation Iraqi government launched counter offences against ISIL. New mass graves of ISIL victims were also discovered in Tikrit.
Afghanistan	August 2018	August 2018 Kabul suicide bombing	A suicide bombing occurred on Wednesday 15 August 2018 in the Shia region of Kabul took place. Afghanistan's Ministry of Public Health reported that 48 people including 34 students were killed and 67 were injured. The responsibility was claimed by ISIS.	48	67	ISIS claimed responsibility for the attack.

== See also ==
- List of Islamist terrorist attacks
- List of terrorist incidents, 2014
- List of terrorist incidents, 2015
- List of wars and battles involving ISIL
