= Alam (finial) =

Decorative top of a minaret, or Ottoman military standard

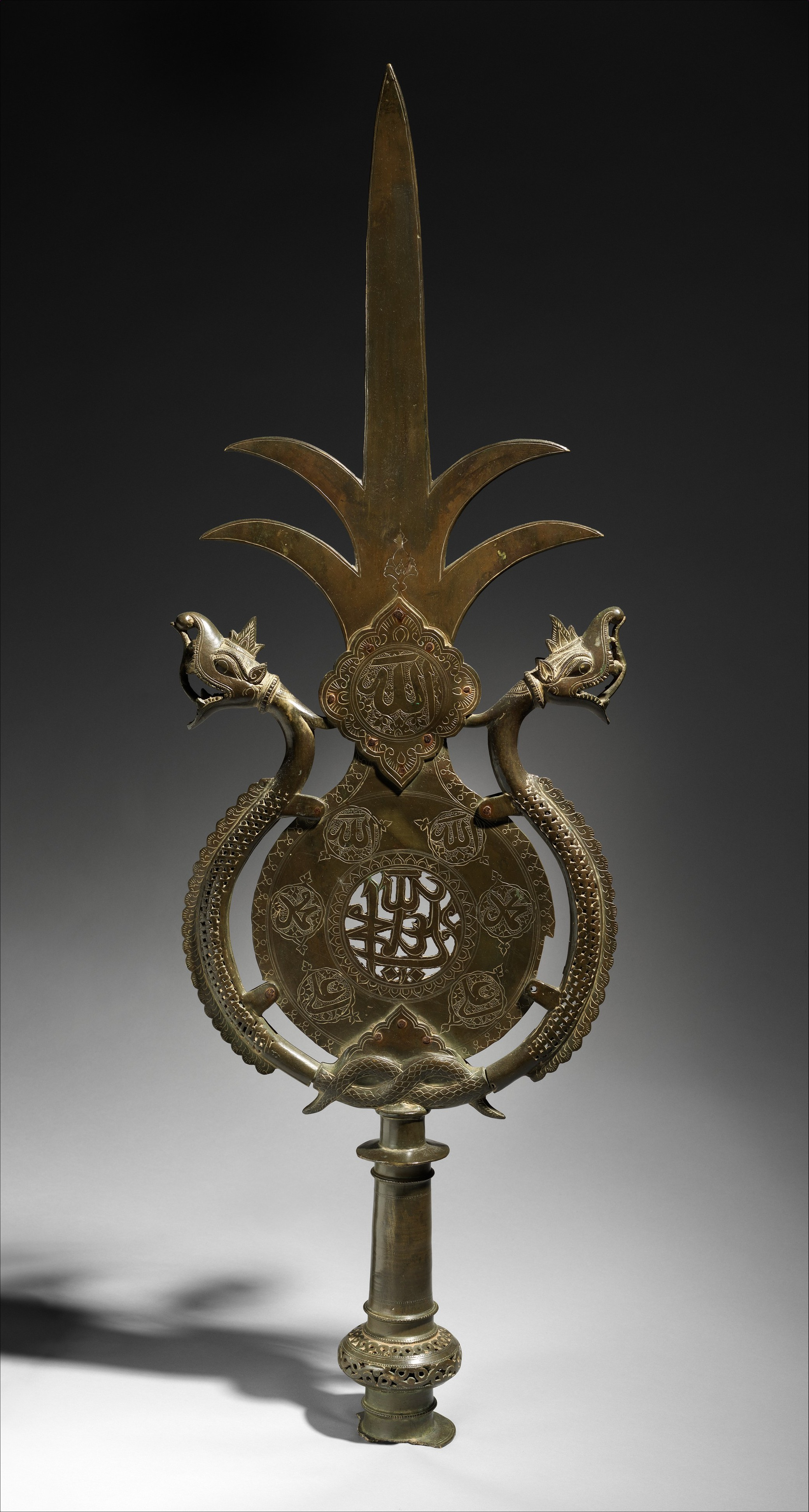
A Shi'a 'alam (17th-18th century), with the names of Allah, Muhammad, and 'Ali

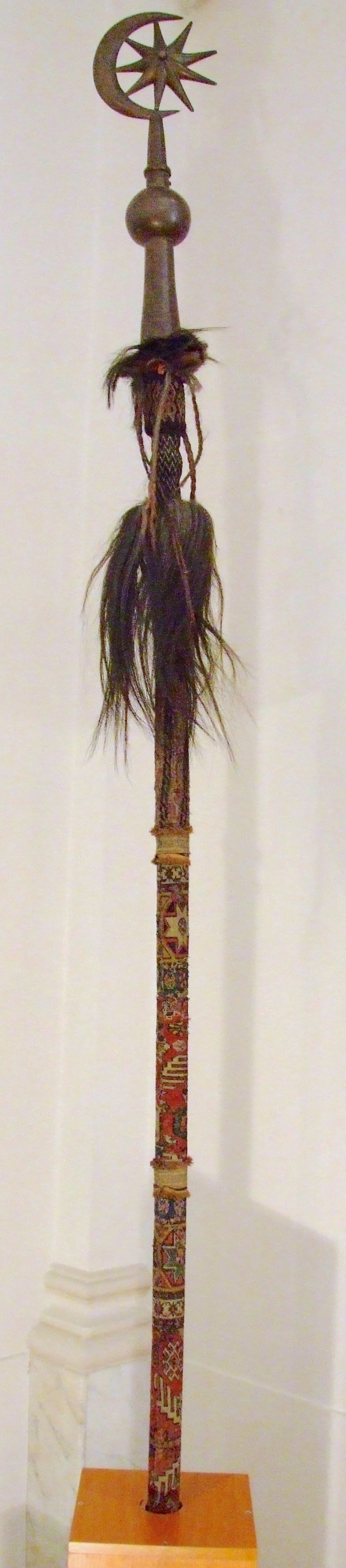
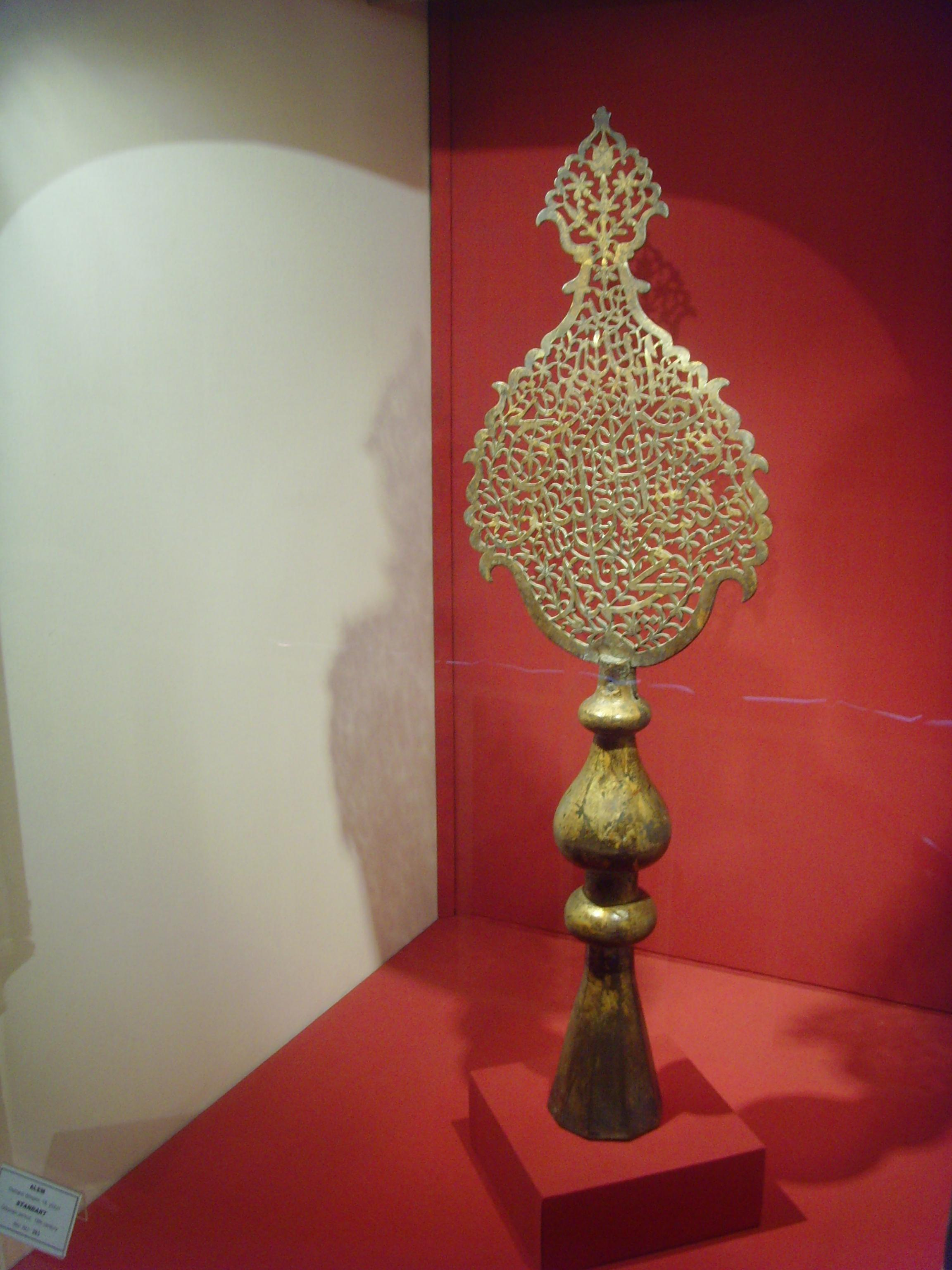
A 19th-century Ottoman tugh (left), and an 18th-century Ottoman alem for a flagpole (right)

An 'alam (Arabic: علَم, lit. 'flag') or alem (Turkish: alem) is a standard or flagpole in Islamic culture, typically topped by an ornate metal finial. The word 'alam is used generally to denote a banner but in the context of Islamic art it can refer to examples of the metal finials.

This type of flagpole is often used by Shi'a Muslims in religious processions or ceremonial functions, as well as by groups and states in Iran (e.g. the Safavids) and the Indian subcontinent. In Ottoman Turkish, the corresponding word alem means a military banner consisting of a tall pole (sap) with a silk flag or banner (sancak) topped by a metal finial (saifa). In modern Turkish, sancak can apply to the whole standard and not simply the fabric of the banner. The word alem came to be applied to the decoration at the top of the flagpole.

The word also came to be applied to the architectural device which caps a minaret, dome of a mosque or minber (pulpit). It may incorporate an Islamic emblem of the crescent (with star), a tulip or other shape. The central Asian tugh with yak or horse hair (instead of a flag) can also be topped by an alem. Miniatures from the Seljuk era show gilded finials on top of tentpoles.

One or more metal protective cases or boxes (muhafazas) - often octagonal - containing a diminutive copy of the Qur'an were attached below the alem by a cord or chain.

== See also ==
- Flags of the Ottoman Empire
- Flags of the Mughal Empire
