= Alam (Muharram rituals) =

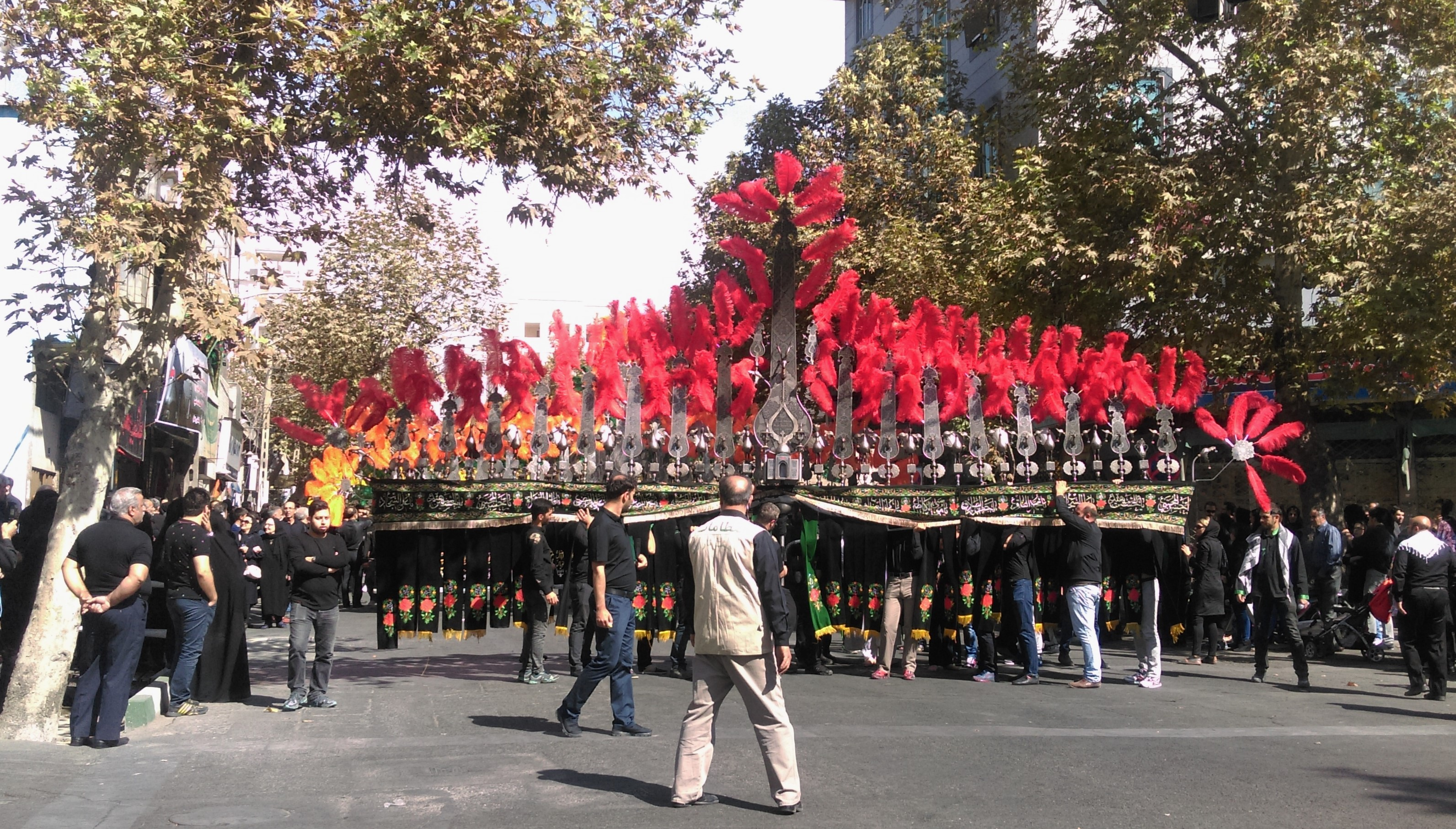
Alam-keshi during Ashura processions

An alam, also known as an alamat, jarideh, or tugh, is one of the symbolic objects used in Shi'a Ashura mourning rituals across Iran. It usually consists of a tall wooden pole about five or six meters in height, topped with a brass hand-shaped finial, with costly colored fabrics tied to the pole. The alam may be made of metal, wood, or iron and is carried by an alamdar (standard-bearer).The alam is usually carried at the front of a procession of mourners. Older alams commonly have a base inscribed with religious words or phrases, flanked by two azhdahas or lions with open mouths. Some alams may reach widths of between 3 and 10 meters and often have 11 blades, with the central blade larger than the others. The spaces between the blades were also filled with metal ornaments fashioned in the shapes of pigeons, peacocks, tulips, domes, shrines, and other forms. The alamdar places the wooden base of the alam into a supporting strap fastened around the waist and shoulders and carries it while moving. Alams and flags were objects of fundamental importance in warfare. There were, however, differences between an alam and a flag, and they were also ranked according to their importance. The alams used in northern Iran differ from those found in the central regions of the country.

== History ==
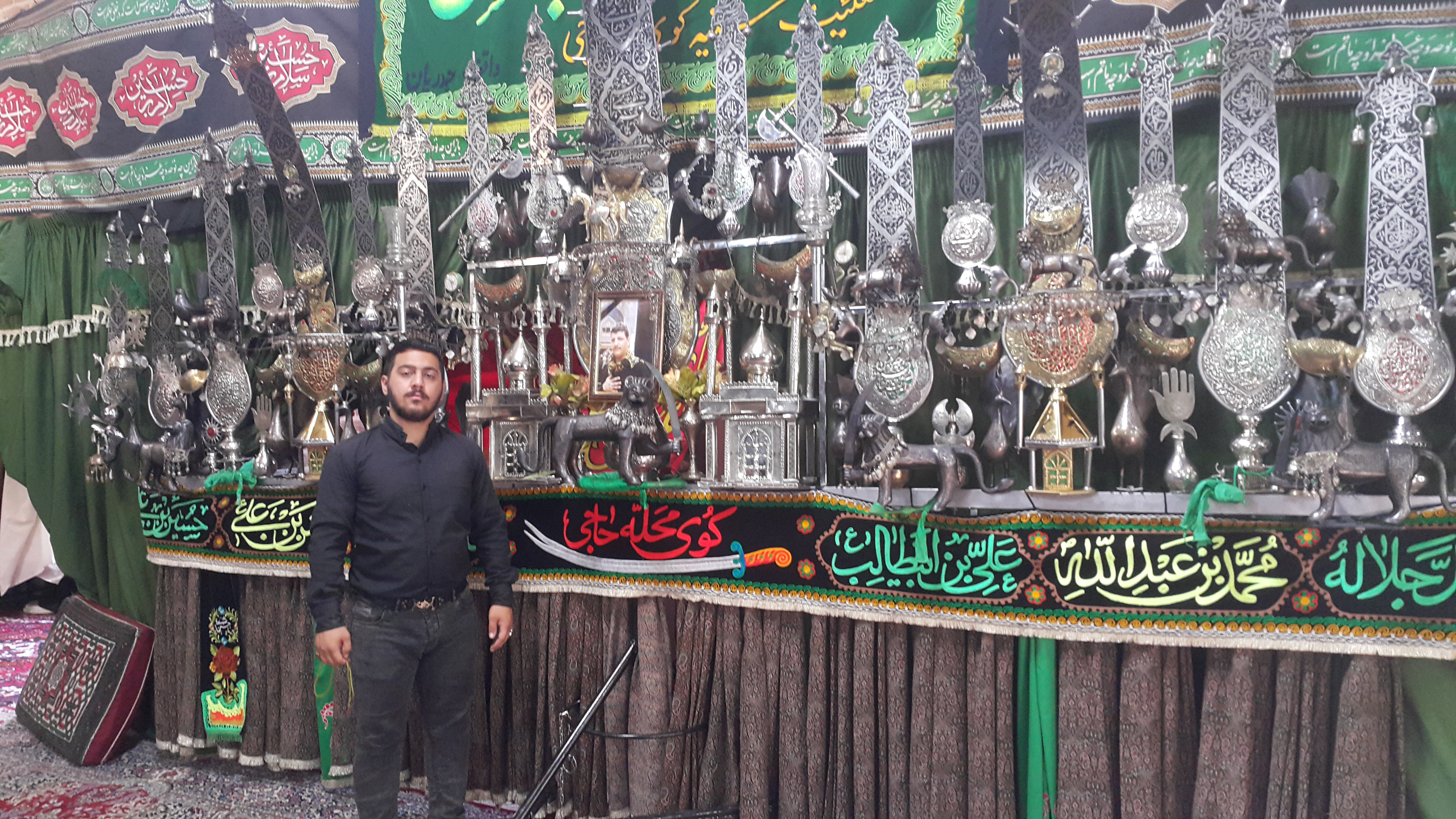
An alam resting on a customized tripod

It appears that a form of alam was used for Muharram ceremonies during the Buyid period. Under the Aq Qoyunlu, drums and alams from Imamzadeh shrines were carried by religious scholars in religious ceremonies. With the establishment of the Shiʿi Safavid state, the alam came to be widely used in Muharram ceremonies and other religious rituals.

The oldest surviving Iranian alams are kept in the Topkapı Palace in Istanbul. These alams were taken as war booty and, after the Ottoman capture of Tabriz, Sultan Selim I transferred them to Istanbul. Following the spread of Shiʿism under Shah Ismail, they were used by mourning processions. They were made from sheets of iron fashioned into long, narrow blades. At the top, traditional and tribal symbols were displayed; among Shiʿis, the name of God, the names of God, Muhammad, and Ali, or the names of God and the Five Members of the ahl al-bayt were inlaid in silver or engraved. The long, narrow iron blade ended in a larger circular plate enclosed within a metal frame. The edges of this frame were decorated with azhdahas with their mouths open. These alams were mounted on wooden or metal poles and carried at the head of processions.

In later years, especially during the Zand and Qajar periods, additional decorations were added to the alams carried by mourning processions, and religious mourners used them during periods of mourning as well as on other commemorative and ceremonial occasions.

One of the symbols used in mourning processions for Imam Husayn is an object known as an alamat. According to one view, this alamat was derived from the cross carried by Christians in Holy Thursday and Good Friday processions, and was adopted during the Safavid period for political purposes. This hypothesis has been widely accepted, without proper verification, by many religious believers and even some specialists, largely because of the visual resemblance between the alamat and the cross. Contrary to this claim, the practice of carrying the alamat developed from the carrying of the tugh in mourning ceremonies, a long-standing tradition among eastern peoples such as the Chinese, Mongols, and Göktürks. Over time, as these peoples migrated, the tradition spread into Islamic lands and eventually entered the mourning ceremonies for Imam Husayn. The tugh was later altered during the Qajar period into the form of the modern alamat; according to this argument, the alamat in its modern form did not exist during the Safavid period.

== Alam-Keshi ==
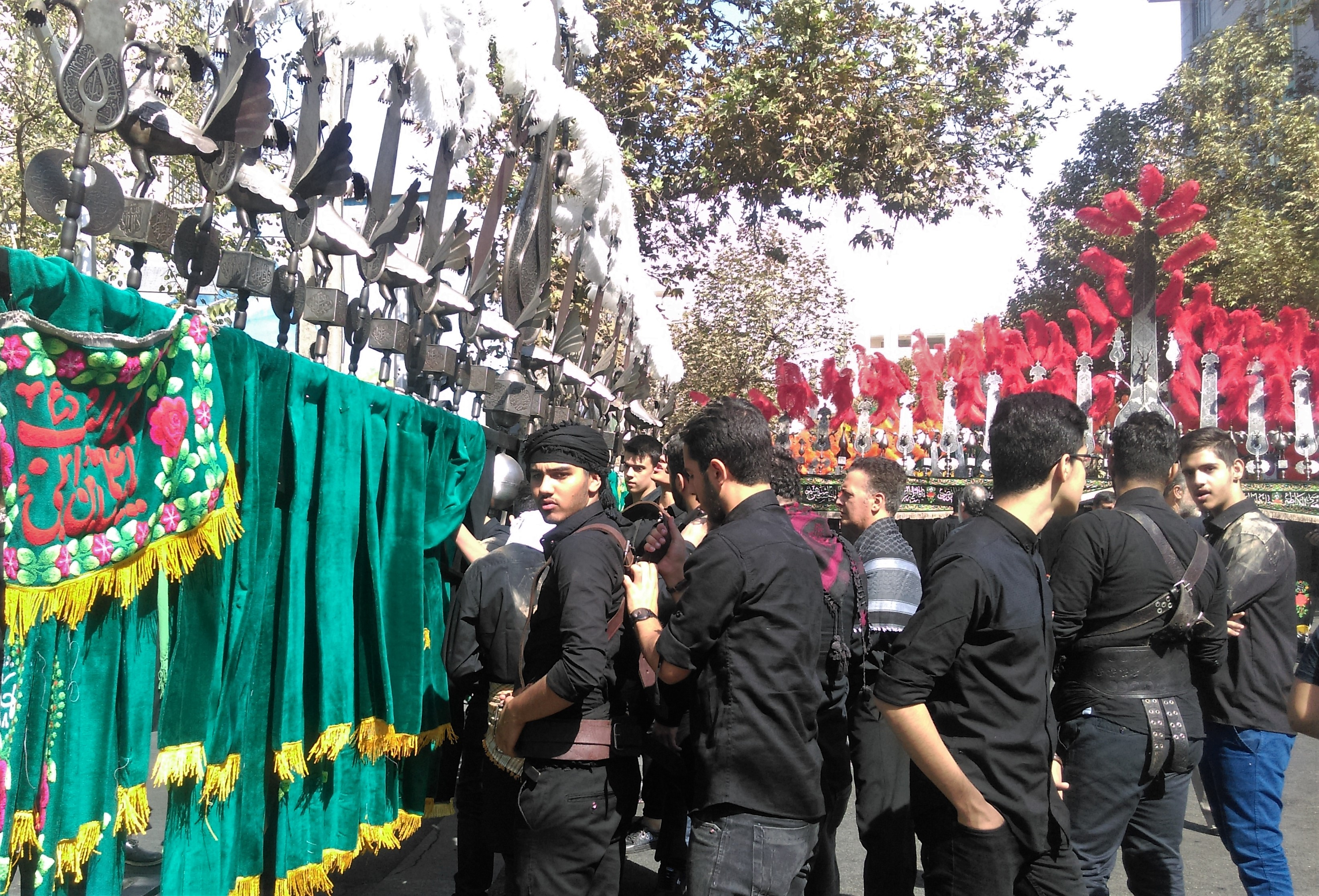
A group of youth waiting to carrying an alam

Alam-keshi or alamat-keshi is a form of ceremonial performance associated with mourning on Shiʿi religious occasions. In this ritual, one or more mourning alams are carried through public streets and spaces. In Iran, alam-keshi is performed mainly on Tasuʿa and Ashura as part of Muharram mourning ceremonies. Usually on the morning and around midday of Ashura, the mourning alams are displayed at the head of mourning processions and carried through the streets and alleys of a neighborhood. The use of alams in Shiʿi mourning rituals has gone through periods of greater and lesser popularity and has had both supporters and opponents.

=== Methods of Alam-keshi ===
Today, alamat-keshi is seen alongside mourning processions involving zanjir-zani (chain-beating) and sineh-zani (chest-beating) on occasions such as Tasu'a, Ashura, and Arba'in. The alams are generally positioned after the procession's banners and before the groups performing zanjir-zani and sineh-zani. Small to medium-sized alams are carried by people with sufficient physical strength, while very large alams are moved on specially designed wheeled platforms. In the past, alams were smaller and could be carried more easily. Today, however, transporting heavy alams is usually difficult and slow and requires several people prepared for the task. Young people with suitable physical strength are generally the most eager to take part.

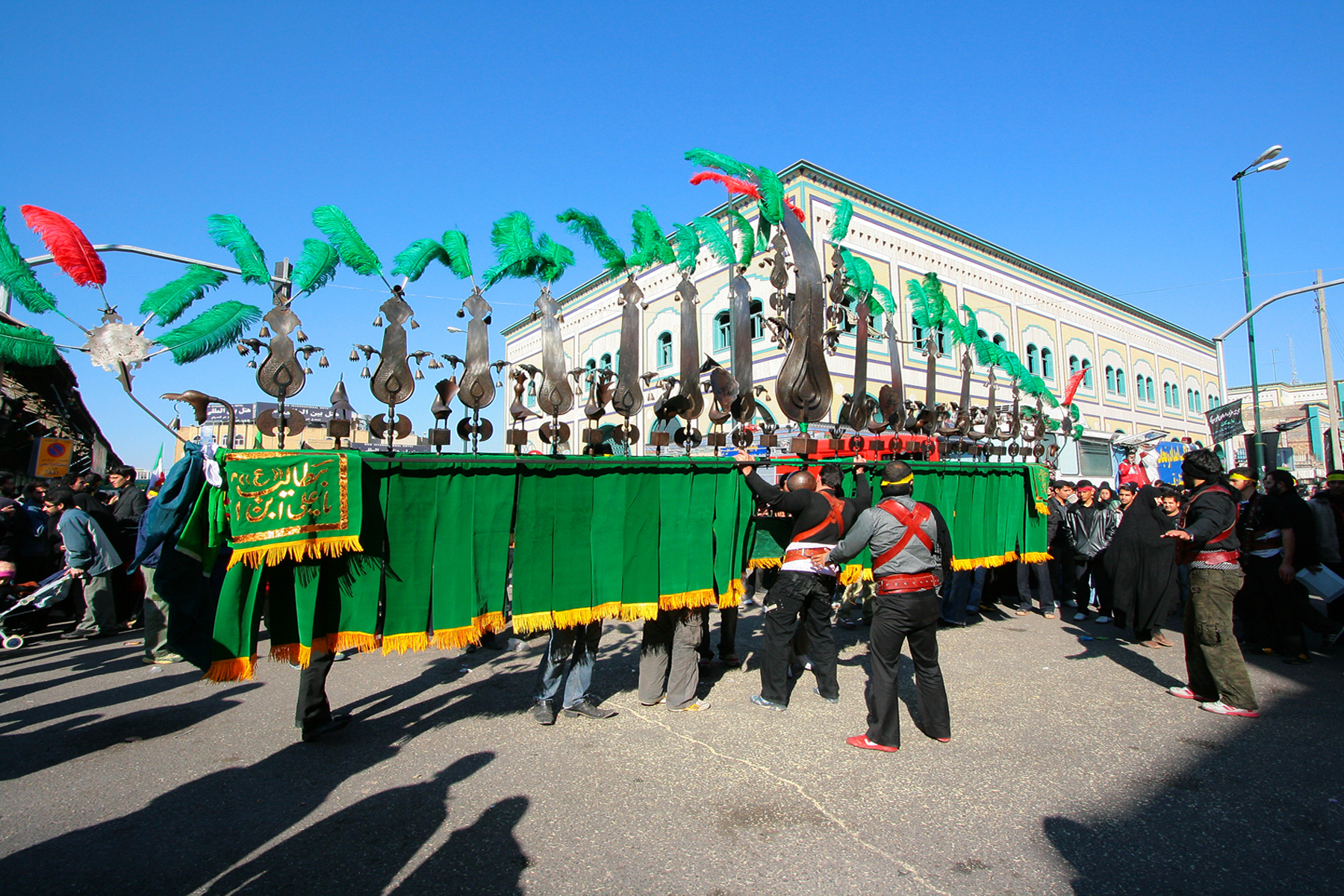
An alam carried by a group of alamdars

The person who carries the alam is called an alamdar. The alamdar wears a special leather carrying belt, secured around the waist and shoulders. This belt includes a socket or support in which the base of the alam is placed. Once the person preparing to carry the alam takes position behind it, the other alamdars collectively lift the alam from its base and set it onto the carrier's belt. Depending on the carrier's strength and skill, as well as the weight and size of the alam, the alamdar may carry it for anything from a few steps to a considerable distance. When signs of fatigue become apparent, another person takes over as the next alamdar in the same manner. In squares and gathering places, special display performances may also be carried out with the alam, most commonly in the following forms:

- Rotating the alamat 360 degrees while remaining in place.
- “Saluting” with the alamat, which consists of moving it back and forth in such a way that the blades undergo strong oscillating movements.
- Paired rotation and saluting: when two alamats belonging to two different mourning processions meet face to face, they are positioned parallel to one another and perform one or both of the preceding actions, rotation and saluting.

=== History of Alam-Keshi ===
A decorated alam with yellow feathers

Some claim that the use of the alam in a cross-like form dates back to the Safavid period, when certain elements were supposedly adopted from Christian rituals in Europe and the alam became recognized as one of the symbols of mourning. This claim, however, is specifically incorrect, because studies indicate that cross-shaped alamats only became common during the Qajar period, and that no such alamats existed during the Safavid era.

In his book Alavid Shiism and Safavid Shiism, Shariati claims that after Shah Abbas II came to power and showed particular support for mourning ceremonies commemorating Huseyn ibn Ali, the third Imam of the Shi'a, various forms of mourning ritual became widespread in Iran, to the extent that a special ministry known as the “Ministry of Rawza-Khani and Ta'ziyeh” was established. He further claims that a group of courtiers was then sent to Eastern Europe to study Christian rituals and make use of them. According to the available documentary evidence, however, no such ministry existed, and no group was sent to Europe for this purpose.

Shi'a jurists have generally regarded the use of the alamat in mourning ceremonies as permissible; however, some have not permitted presenting this practice as part of Islam, or the use of animate imagery such as depictions of people and animals. Conflicts during alam-keshi are frequently reported in the historical record of alam-carrying in Iranian mourning rituals. These disputes have mostly arisen from rivalry and competition between alamdars and mourning associations.

=== Alam Designs and Ornamentation ===
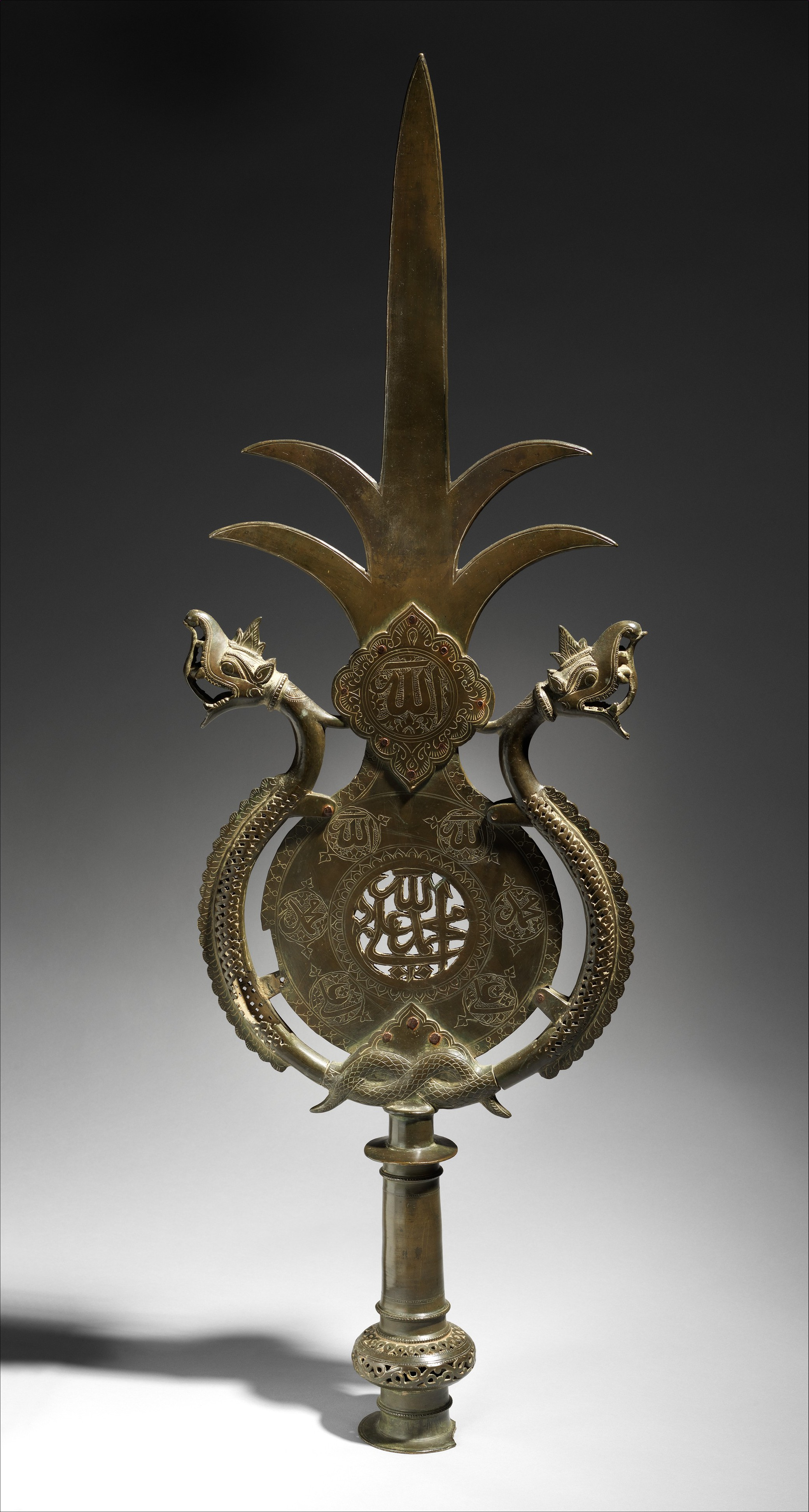
An alam decorated with azhdahas on the flanks

The alam is carried at the head of the line of mourners. Older alams usually have a base inscribed with religious words, and two open-mouthed dragons stand guard over it; their faces are also perforated. Some alams feature images of a peacock, a bird, four flower vases, and a pair of parrots on either side of the alam. Sometimes two candlesticks are attached to the rod on which the frame rests. In the past, alams had only a single blade, to which various ornaments were attached. Gradually, this developed into three-bladed, five-bladed, seven-bladed, and so on, up to twenty-one-bladed alams. The lion on the alam symbolizes power and courage, and represents Ali ibn Abi Talib, one of whose titles is Asad Allah al-Ghalib (“the Victorious Lion of God”). Some also believe that it refers to the story of a lion appearing after the killing of Husayn ibn Ali at Karbala. Shaykh al-Kulayni relates a tradition in al-Kafi according to which, after Husayn ibn Ali was killed, his enemies intended to trample his body with their horses. Rubab said to Zaynab: “My lady! Safina, a servant of the Messenger of God, was once traveling by sea when his ship was wrecked and he took refuge on an island. There he suddenly encountered a lion. He told the lion, ‘I am a servant of the Messenger of God.’ The lion then moved ahead of him, roaring, and showed him the way. That lion is now resting in this region. Allow me to go to it and inform it of what the enemy intends to do tomorrow.” Fidda then went to the lion and told it what had happened. The lion rose, came to Husayn ibn Ali’s body, and placed its paws upon it. When the enemy horsemen approached the Imam’s body and saw the lion, Umar ibn Sa'd told them, “This is a new disturbance; do not provoke it. Turn back,” and they withdrew.

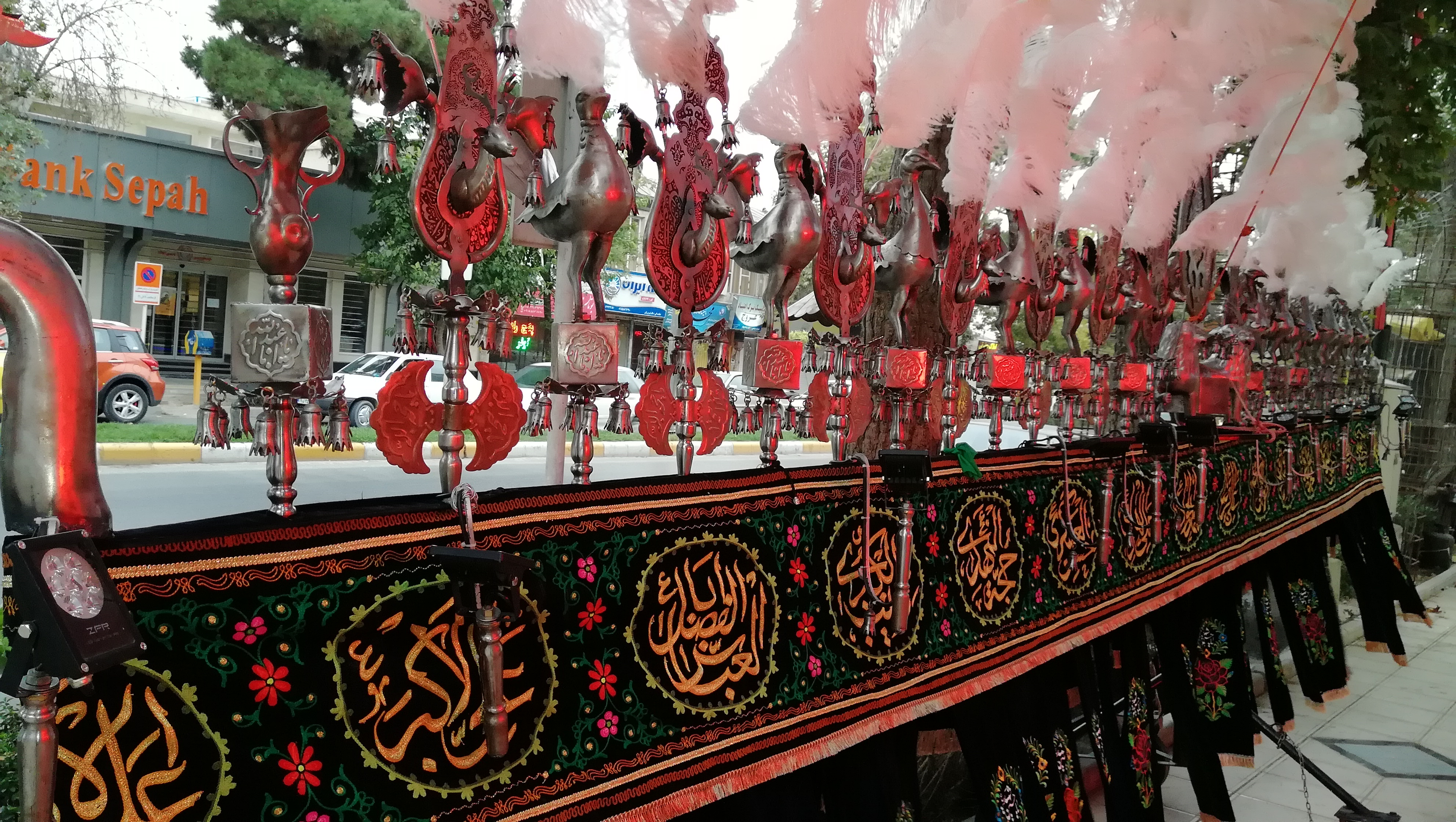
An alam in Bojrnord

The gazelle symbolizes Zamen-e Ahu (“Guarantor of the Gazelle”), a title associated with Ali ibn Musa al-Rida. It is also interpreted as referring to Husayn ibn Ali’s protection, mercy, and forgiveness at Karbala, including both the story of Hurr and his admonition to Shimr. The bell is associated with the story of the bells on the camels falling silent at the beginning of Zaynab al-Kubra’s sermon in Damascus. The peacock symbolizes Hujjat ibn al-Hasan, based on the saying, “al-Mahdi is the peacock of the people of Paradise.” The camel symbolizes the captivity of the Ahl al-Bayt. Some also regard it as a reference to a saying attributed to the Prophet concerning the Mi'raj: “I saw an endless caravan of camels moving along, carrying the virtues of Ali ibn Abi Talib.” The morgh-e rokh used alongside the alam represents Buraq, the mount of the Prophet on the night of the Mi'raj. The hoopoe symbolizes the role of envoy and messenger of Ashura. The rooster, as the bird that calls at the time of prayer, symbolizes honor and protective courage. The pigeon symbolizes freedom and martyrdom. Candles and lanterns symbolize sanctity and purity.

== Gallery ==
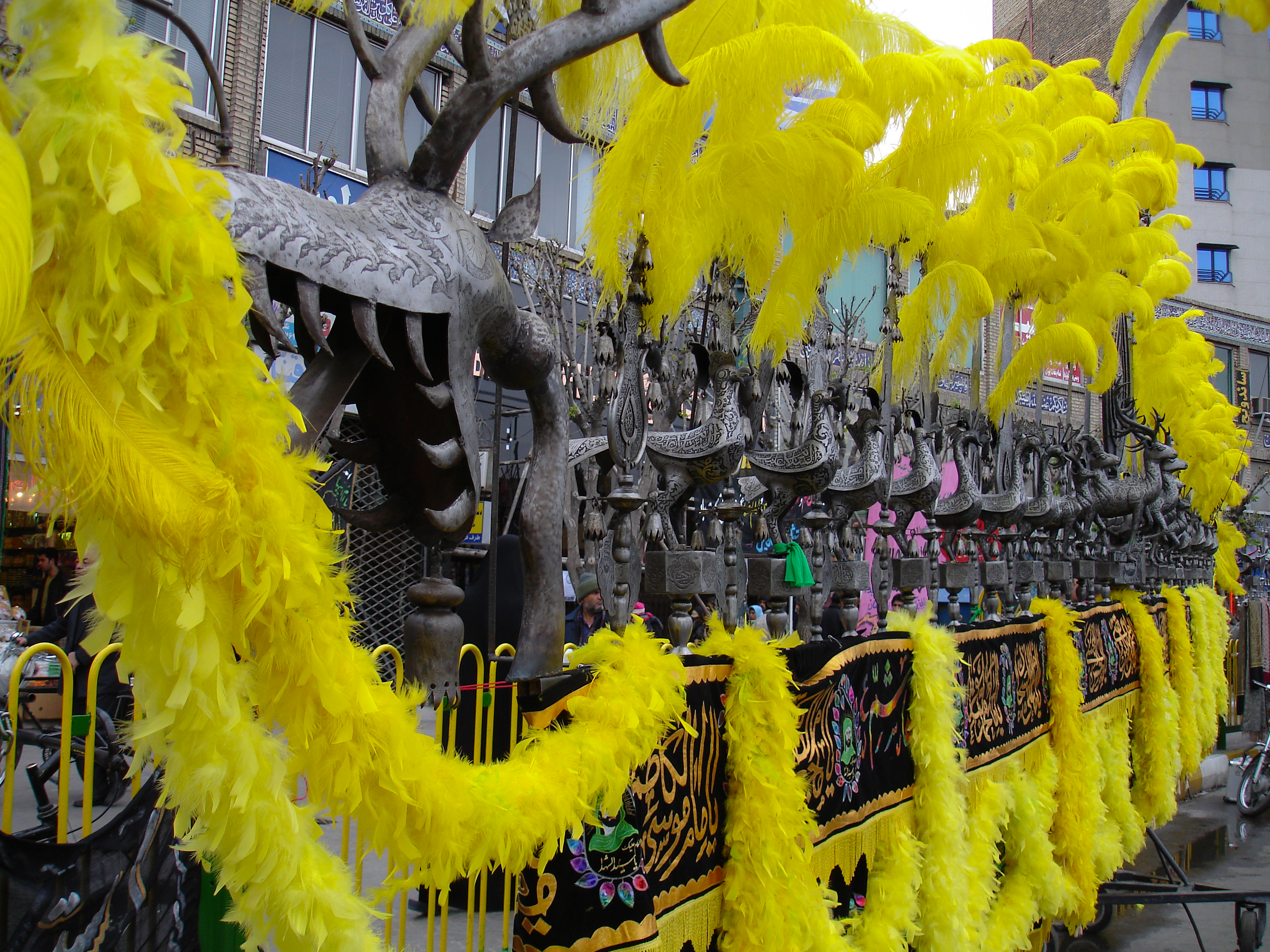
A uniquely-decorated alam from Mashhad

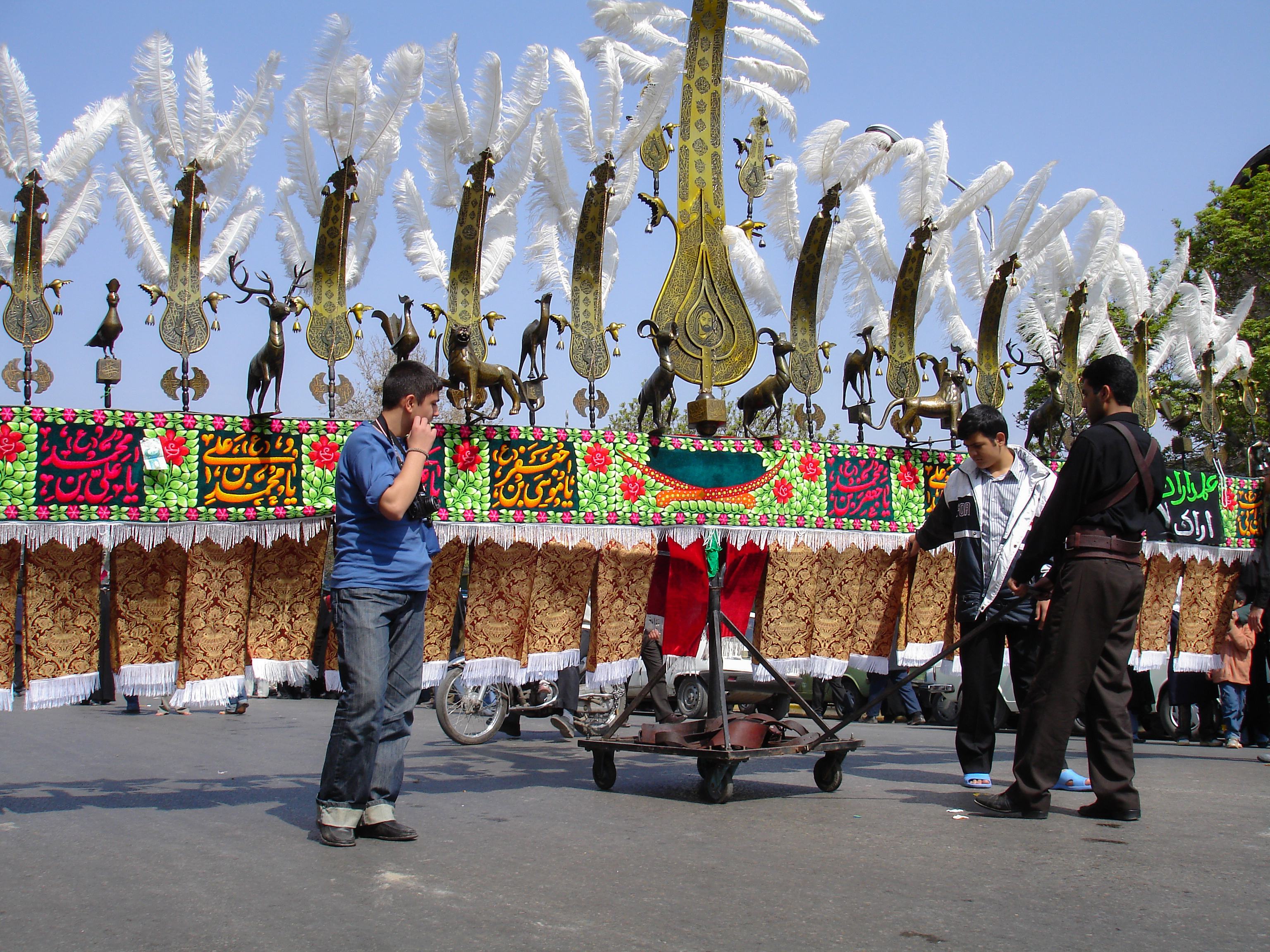
An alam carried on wheels

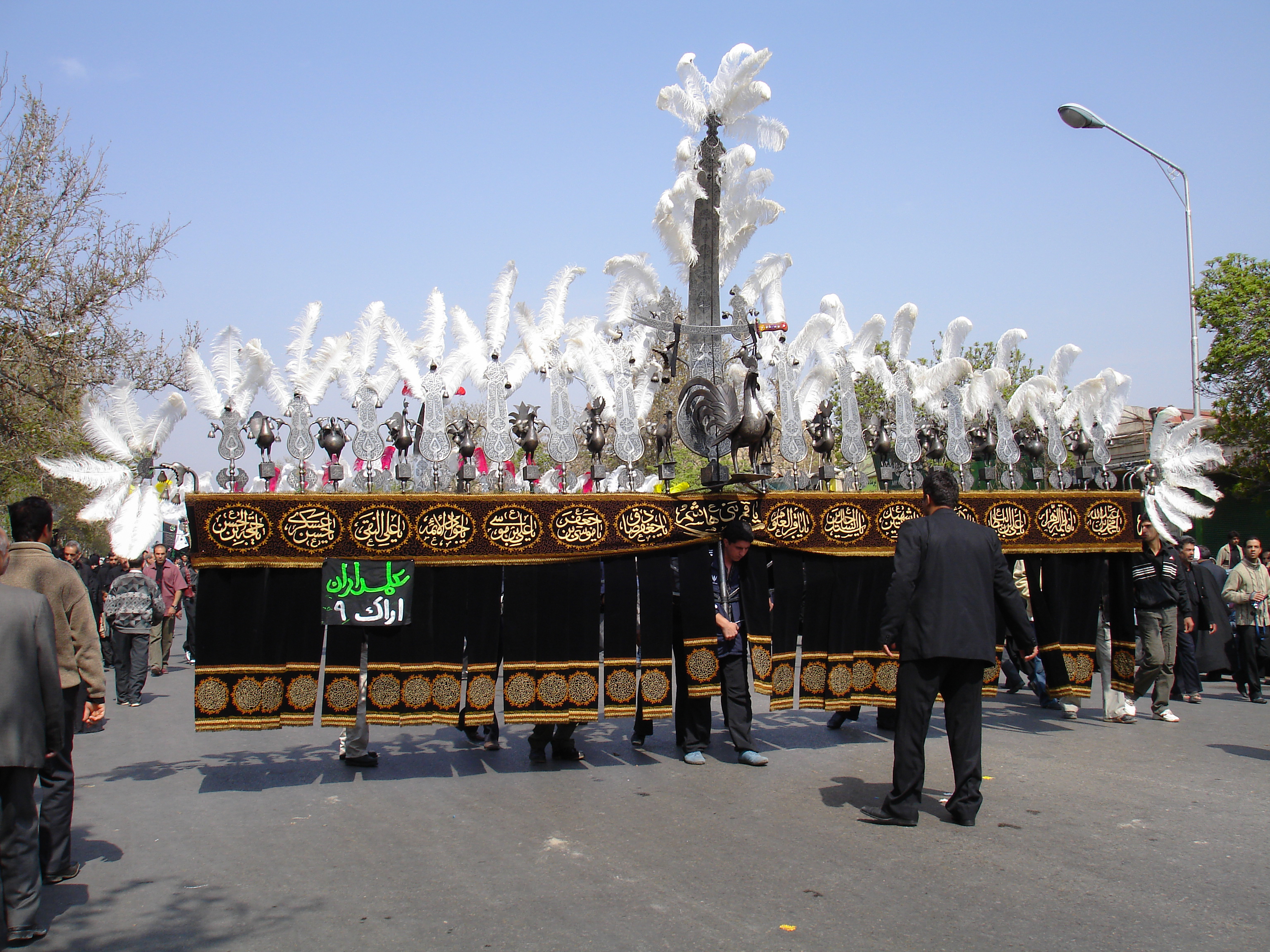
An alam used in Arba'in

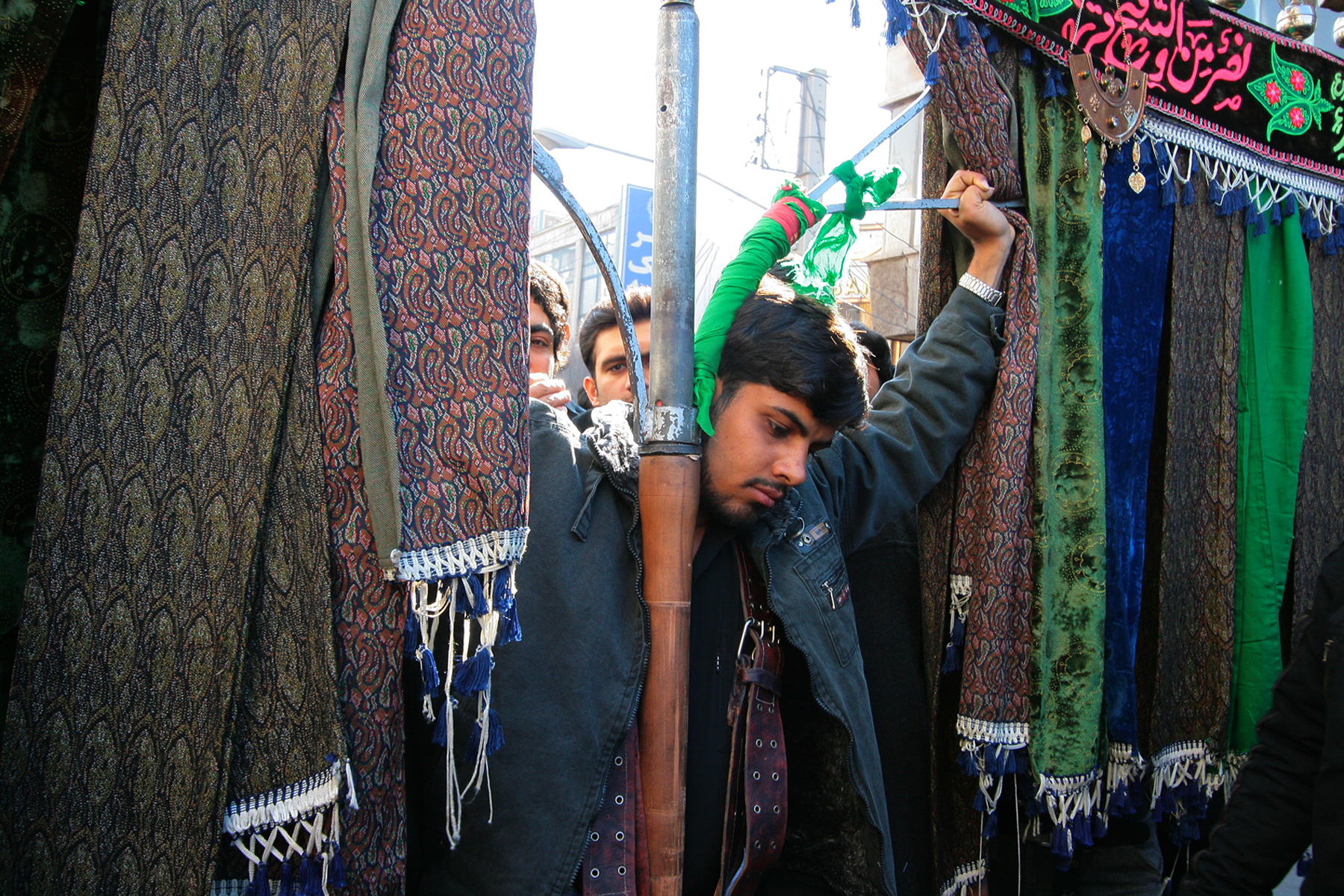
An alamdar holding up the alam

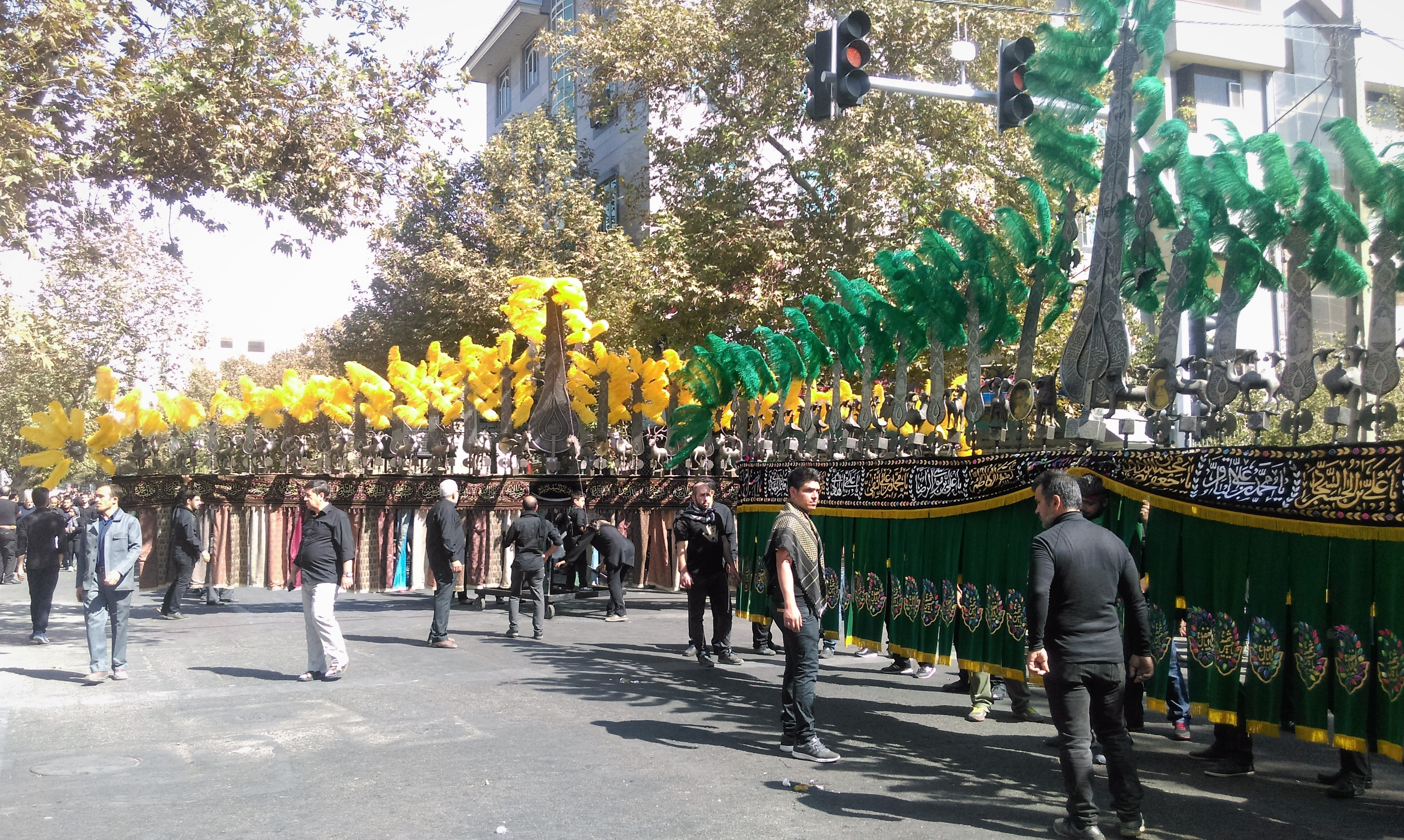
Alam-keshi in Tehran
