= December 16 =

December 16 this year in various calendars
- Wednesday, 16 December 2026
Akan	Kuruwukuo
Armenian	29 Kʿaloch 1476
Aztec	Tozoztontli 15, 3 Tōchtli
Babylonian	6 Kislimu, 2337 SE
Balinese pawukon	Menga, Pasah, Laba, Paing, Paniron, Buda of Wariga, Brahma, Urungan, Manusa
Bengali	1 Poush, BS 1433
Chinese	Yang Wood Rat・Winnowing Basket Mansion; Fire Horse Year, Month 11, Day 8 (Daxue, 6 days until Dongzhi)
Common Era	16 December 2026 CE
Coptic	7 Koiak, AM 1743
Egyptian	4 Pachon, 2775 NE
Ethiopian	7 Tākḫśāś, 2019 Amätä Məhrät
French Republican	Décade III, Quintidi de Frimaire de l'Année 235 de la République
Gregorian	16 December, AD 2026
Hebrew	6 Tevet, AM 5787
Hindu	Śatabhiṣaj・Vajra; Solar: 1 Pauṣa, 1948 SE; Lunisolar: Saptamī, Śukla pakṣa of Mārgaśīrṣa, 2083 VE; Rāudra・5127 KY・1,872,925
Icelandic	Miðvikudagur, 24 Ýlir 2026
Islamic	6 Rajab, AH 1448 (using tabular method)
ISO week date	2026-W51-3
Japanese	8 Shimotsuki, Reiwa 8 (Taisetsu, 6 days until Tōji)
Julian	3 December, AD 2026 (AM 7535)
Julian day	2461391
Korean	8 Jwidal, 4359 DE
Maya	13.0.14.3.8; 1 Kankin, 3 Lamat
Roman	ante diem III Nonas Decembres, MMDCCLXXIX AUC
Solar Hijri	25 Azar, SH 1405
Tibetan	7 mgo, me pho rta 2153 or 1772 or 1000

<<	December					>>
Su	Mo	Tu	We	Th	Fr	Sa
		1	2	3	4	5
6	7	8	9	10	11	12
13	14	15	16	17	18	19
20	21	22	23	24	25	26
27	28	29	30	31
2026

December 16 in recent years
2025 (Tuesday)
2024 (Monday)
2023 (Saturday)
2022 (Friday)
2021 (Thursday)
2020 (Wednesday)
2019 (Monday)
2018 (Sunday)
2017 (Saturday)
2016 (Friday)

December 16 is the 350th day of the year (351st in leap years) in the Gregorian calendar; 15 days remain until the end of the year.

== Events ==
=== Pre-1600 ===
- 533 – The Digest, the great collection of all Roman jurists' law, is issued together with a new official law textbook for legal schools, The Institutes.
- 714 – Pepin of Herstal, mayor of the Merovingian palace, dies at Jupille (modern Belgium). He is succeeded by his infant grandson Theudoald, while his widow Plectrude holds actual power in the Frankish Kingdom.
- 755 – An Lushan revolts against Chancellor Yang Guozhong at Yanjing, initiating the An Lushan Rebellion during the Tang dynasty of China.
- 1431 – Hundred Years' War: Henry VI of England is crowned King of France at Notre Dame in Paris.
- 1497 – Vasco da Gama passes the Great Fish River at the southern tip of Africa, where Bartolomeu Dias had previously turned back to Portugal.
- 1575 – An earthquake with an estimated magnitude of 8.5M_{w} strikes Valdivia, Chile.
- 1598 – Seven-Year War: Battle of Noryang: The final battle of the Seven-Year War is fought between the China and the Korean allied forces and Japanese navies, resulting in a decisive allied forces victory.

=== 1601–1900 ===
- 1653 – English Interregnum: The Protectorate: Oliver Cromwell becomes Lord Protector of the Commonwealth of England, Scotland and Ireland.
- 1689 – Convention Parliament: The Declaration of Right is embodied in the Bill of Rights.
- 1707 – The most recent eruption of Mount Fuji.
- 1761 – Seven Years' War: After a four-month siege, the Russians under Pyotr Rumyantsev take the Prussian fortress of Kołobrzeg.
- 1773 – American Revolution: Boston Tea Party: Members of the Sons of Liberty disguised as Mohawk Indians dump hundreds of crates of tea into Boston harbor as a protest against the Tea Act.
- 1777 – Virginia becomes the first state to ratify the Articles of Confederation.
- 1782 – British East India Company: Muharram Rebellion: Hada and Mada Miah lead the first anti-British uprising in the subcontinent against Robert Lindsay and his contingents in Sylhet Shahi Eidgah.
- 1811 – The first two in a series of four severe earthquakes occur in the vicinity of New Madrid, Missouri.
- 1826 – Benjamin W. Edwards rides into Mexican-controlled Nacogdoches, Texas, and declares himself ruler of the Republic of Fredonia.
- 1838 – Great Trek: Battle of Blood River: Voortrekkers led by Andries Pretorius and Sarel Cilliers defeat Zulu impis, led by Dambuza (Nzobo) and Ndlela kaSompisi in what is today KwaZulu-Natal, South Africa.
- 1850 – The Charlotte Jane and the Randolph bring the first of the Canterbury Pilgrims to Lyttelton, New Zealand.
- 1863 – American Civil War: Confederate President Jefferson Davis appoints General Joseph E. Johnston to replace General Braxton Bragg as commander of the Army of Tennessee.
- 1864 – American Civil War: The Battle of Nashville ends as the Union Army of the Cumberland under General George H. Thomas routs and destroys the Confederate Army of Tennessee under General John Bell Hood, ending its effectiveness as a combat unit.
- 1880 – Outbreak of the First Boer War between the Boer South African Republic and the British Empire.
- 1882 – Wales and England contest the first Home Nations (now Six Nations) rugby union match.
- 1883 – Tonkin Campaign: French forces capture the Sơn Tây citadel.

=== 1901–present ===
- 1905 – In rugby union, the "Match of the Century" is played between Wales and New Zealand at Cardiff Arms Park.
- 1912 – First Balkan War: The Royal Hellenic Navy defeats the Ottoman Navy at the Battle of Elli.
- 1914 – World War I: Admiral Franz von Hipper commands a raid on Scarborough, Hartlepool and Whitby.
- 1920 – The Haiyuan earthquake of 8.5M_{w} rocks the Gansu province in China, killing an estimated 200,000.
- 1942 – The Holocaust: Schutzstaffel chief Heinrich Himmler orders that Roma candidates for extermination be deported to Auschwitz.
- 1944 – World War II: The Battle of the Bulge begins with the surprise offensive of three German armies through the Ardennes forest.
- 1951 – A Miami Airlines Curtiss C-46 Commando crashes in Elizabeth, New Jersey, killing all 58 aboard including dancer Doris Ruby.
- 1960 – A United Air Lines Douglas DC-8 and a TWA Lockheed Super Constellation collide over Staten Island, New York and crash, killing all 128 people aboard both aircraft and six more on the ground.
- 1968 – Second Vatican Council: Official revocation of the Edict of Expulsion of Jews from Spain.
- 1971 – Bangladesh Liberation War and Indo-Pakistani War of 1971: The surrender of the Pakistan Army brings an end to both conflicts. This is commemorated annually as Victory Day in Bangladesh and Vijay Diwas in India respectively.
- 1971 – The United Kingdom recognizes Bahrain's independence, which is commemorated annually as Bahrain's National Day.
- 1972 – The Constitution of the People's Republic of Bangladesh is enacted.
- 1973 – Aeroflot Flight 2022 crashes in the Soviet Union's (now Russia) Volokolamsky District, killing all 51 aboard, including four Lithuanian doctors.
- 1986 – The Jeltoqsan riots erupt in Alma-Ata, Kazakh SSR, in response to Soviet leader Mikhail Gorbachev's dismissal of ethnic Kazakh Dinmukhamed Kunaev, the First Secretary of the Communist Party of Kazakhstan, and his replacement with Gennady Kolbin, an ethnic Russian from the Russian SFSR.
- 1989 – Romanian Revolution: Protests break out in Timișoara, Romania, in response to an attempt by the government to evict dissident Hungarian pastor László Tőkés.
- 1992 – Deportation of Hamas members: Israeli authorities began deporting hundreds of Palestinians suspected to be members of Hamas across the Lebanese border.
- 1997 – Dennō Senshi Porygon: Over 600 kids in Japan suffer photosensitive epileptic seizures after watching an episode of the Pokémon anime.
- 2011 – The Zhanaozen massacre occurs when violent protests by oil workers take place in Zhanaozen, Kazakhstan, resulting in security forces killing at least 14 and injuring 100 more.
- 2013 – A bus falls from an elevated highway in Manila, capital of the Philippines, killing at least 18 people with 20 injured.
- 2014 – Tehrik-i-Taliban Pakistan militants attack an Army Public School in Peshawar, Pakistan, killing 150 people, 132 of them schoolchildren.
- 2022 – A landslide occurs at a camp at an organic farm near the town of Batang Kali in Selangor, Malaysia, trapping 92 people and killing 31.
- 2024 – The Abundant Life Christian School shooting in Madison, Wisconsin, United States, takes place, resulting in the death of three people.

== Births ==
=== Pre-1600 ===
- 1364 – Emperor Manuel III of Trebizond (died 1417)
- 1485 – Catherine of Aragon, Spanish princess, Queen Consort of England (died 1536)
- 1534 – Hans Bol, Flemish artist (died 1593)
- 1582 – Robert Bertie, 1st Earl of Lindsey (died 1642)
- 1584 – John Selden, English jurist and scholar (died 1654)
- 1585 – Livia della Rovere, Italian noble (died 1641)

=== 1601–1900 ===
- 1605 – Jerome Weston, 2nd Earl of Portland, English diplomat (died 1663)
- 1614 – Eberhard III, Duke of Württemberg (died 1674)
- 1630 – Mary Somerset, Duchess of Beaufort, British botanist (died 1715)
- 1714 – George Whitefield, English Anglican priest (died 1770)
- 1716 – Louis Jules Mancini Mazarini, French poet and diplomat (died 1798)
- 1717 – Elizabeth Carter, English poet and scholar (died 1806)
- 1730 – Diego Silang, Filipino revolutionary leader (died 1763)
- 1742 – Gebhard Leberecht von Blücher, German field marshal (died 1819)
- 1770 – Ludwig van Beethoven, composer (died 1827)
- 1775 – Jane Austen, English novelist (died 1817)
- 1775 – François-Adrien Boieldieu, French pianist and composer (died 1834)
- 1776 – Johann Wilhelm Ritter, German chemist, physicist, and philosopher (died 1810)
- 1778 – John Ordronaux, French-American soldier (died 1841)
- 1787 – Mary Russell Mitford, English author and playwright (died 1855)
- 1790 – Leopold I of Belgium (died 1865)
- 1804 – Viktor Bunyakovsky, Russian mathematician and academic (died 1889)
- 1812 – Stuart Donaldson, English-Australian politician, 1st Premier of New South Wales (died 1867)
- 1834 – Léon Walras, French-Swiss economist and theorist (died 1910)
- 1836 – Ernst von Bergmann, Latvian-German surgeon and academic (died 1907)
- 1849 – Mary Hartwell Catherwood, American author and poet (died 1902)
- 1861 – Antonio de La Gándara, French painter and illustrator (died 1917)
- 1863 – George Santayana, Spanish philosopher, novelist, and poet (died 1952)
- 1865 – Olavo Bilac, Brazilian journalist and poet (died 1918)
- 1866 – Wassily Kandinsky, Russian-French painter and theorist (died 1944)
- 1867 – Amy Carmichael, Irish missionary and humanitarian (died 1951)
- 1869 – Hristo Tatarchev, Bulgarian physician and activist, co-founded the Internal Macedonian Revolutionary Organization (died 1952)
- 1869 – Bertha Lamme Feicht, American electrical engineer (died 1943)
- 1872 – Anton Denikin, Russian general (died 1947)
- 1882 – Jack Hobbs, English cricketer and journalist (died 1963)
- 1882 – Zoltán Kodály, Hungarian composer, conductor, and musicologist (died 1967)
- 1882 – Walther Meissner, German physicist and engineer (died 1974)
- 1883 – Károly Kós, Hungarian-Romanian architect, ethnologist, and politician (died 1977)
- 1883 – Max Linder, French actor, director, producer, and screenwriter (died 1925)
- 1884 – John Gunn, Australian politician, 29th Premier of South Australia (died 1959)
- 1884 – Seibo Kitamura, Japanese sculptor (died 1987)
- 1888 – Alexander I of Yugoslavia (died 1934)
- 1888 – Alphonse Juin, Algerian-French general (died 1967)
- 1889 – Kim Chwa-chin, South Korean guerrilla leader (died 1930)
- 1895 – Marie Hall Ets, American author and illustrator (died 1984)
- 1896 – Anna Anderson, an imposter who claimed to be Grand Duchess Anastasia of Russia (died 1984)
- 1899 – Noël Coward, English actor, playwright, and composer (died 1973)
- 1900 – Lucille Lortel, American actress and producer (died 1999)
- 1900 – V. S. Pritchett, British writer and literary critic (died 1997)

=== 1901–present ===
- 1901 – Margaret Mead, American anthropologist and author (died 1978)
- 1902 – Rafael Alberti, Spanish poet and playwright (died 1999)
- 1903 – Hardie Albright, American actor (died 1975)
- 1903 – Harold Whitlock, English race walker and coach (died 1985)
- 1905 – Piet Hein, Danish mathematician, author, and poet (died 1996)
- 1905 – Ruben Nirvi, Finnish linguist and professor (died 1986)
- 1907 – Barbara Kent, Canadian-born American film actress (died 2011)
- 1908 – Remedios Varo, Spanish-Mexican surrealist painter & anarchist (died 1963)
- 1910 – Freddie Brown, Peruvian-English cricketer and sportscaster (died 1991)
- 1913 – George Ignatieff, Russian-Canadian scholar and diplomat, 8th Canadian Ambassador to the United Nations (died 1989)
- 1914 – O. Winston Link, American photographer (died 2001)
- 1916 – Ruth Johnson Colvin, American author and educator, founded ProLiteracy Worldwide (died 2024)
- 1917 – Nabi Bux Khan Baloch, Pakistani author and scholar (died 2011)
- 1917 – Pete T. Cenarrusa, American soldier, pilot, and politician, Secretary of State of Idaho (died 2013)
- 1917 – Arthur C. Clarke, English science fiction writer (died 2008)
- 1920 – Frederick Rotimi Williams, Nigerian lawyer and politician (died 2005)
- 1921 – Eulalio González, Mexican singer-songwriter, director, producer, and screenwriter (died 2003)
- 1922 – Cy Leslie, American record producer, founded Pickwick Records (died 2008)
- 1923 – Menahem Pressler, German-American pianist (died 2023)
- 1923 – Ernst Florian Winter, Austrian-American historian and political scientist (died 2014)
- 1924 – Nicolas Sidjakov, Latvian-American illustrator (died 1993)
- 1926 – James McCracken, American tenor and actor (died 1988)
- 1926 – A. N. R. Robinson, Tobagonian lawyer and politician, 3rd President of Trinidad and Tobago (died 2014)
- 1926 – Jeffrey Stone, American actor and screenwriter (died 2012)
- 1927 – Peter Dickinson, Rhodesian-English author and poet (died 2015)
- 1927 – Randall Garrett, American author and poet (died 1987)
- 1928 – Terry Carter, American actor, director, and producer (died 2024)
- 1928 – Philip K. Dick, American philosopher and author (died 1982)
- 1929 – Nicholas Courtney, Egyptian-English actor (died 2011)
- 1930 – Bill Brittain, American author (died 2011)
- 1930 – Sam Most, American flute player and saxophonist (died 2013)
- 1930 – Bill Young, American sergeant and politician (died 2013)
- 1932 – Grace Alele-Williams, Nigerian mathematician and academic (died 2022)
- 1932 – Quentin Blake, English author and illustrator
- 1932 – Lin Zhao, Chinese dissident and Christian executed during the Cultural Revolution (died 1968)
- 1933 – Gloria Romero, Filipino actress (died 2025)
- 1936 – Morris Dees, American lawyer and activist, co-founded the Southern Poverty Law Center
- 1937 – Joyce Bulifant, American actress
- 1937 – Edward Ruscha, American painter and photographer
- 1938 – Frank Deford, American journalist and author (died 2017)
- 1938 – Liv Ullmann, Norwegian actress, director, and screenwriter
- 1939 – Philip Langridge, English tenor (died 2010)
- 1939 – Gordon Miller, English high jumper
- 1941 – Lesley Stahl, American journalist and actress
- 1941 – Roger Neil Wheeler, English general
- 1942 – Donald Carcieri, American educator and politician, 73rd Governor of Rhode Island
- 1943 – Steven Bochco, American television writer and producer (died 2018)
- 1943 – Patti Deutsch, American actress and comedian (died 2017)
- 1944 – Jeff Kanew, American director and screenwriter
- 1944 – Don Meyer, American basketball player and coach (died 2014)
- 1945 – Tony Hicks, English singer and guitarist
- 1946 – Benny Andersson, Swedish singer-songwriter, pianist, and producer
- 1946 – Charles Dennis, Canadian actor, director, producer, and screenwriter
- 1946 – Trevor Pinnock, English harpsichord player and conductor
- 1946 – Tom Stern, American cinematographer
- 1947 – Ben Cross, English actor (died 2020)
- 1947 – Vincent Matthews, American sprinter
- 1947 – Martyn Poliakoff, English chemist and academic
- 1947 – Trevor Żahra, Maltese novelist, poet and illustrator
- 1949 – Billy Gibbons, American singer-songwriter, guitarist, and producer
- 1949 – Heather Hallett, English lawyer and judge
- 1950 – Claudia Cohen, American journalist (died 2007)
- 1950 – Roy Schuiten, Dutch cyclist and manager (died 2006)
- 1951 – Aykut Barka, Turkish scientist (died 2002)
- 1951 – Sally Emerson, English author and poet
- 1951 – Mike Flanagan, American baseball player, coach, and sportscaster (died 2011)
- 1951 – Robben Ford, American guitarist and songwriter
- 1951 – Mark Heard, American singer-songwriter, guitarist, and producer (died 1992)
- 1952 – Joel Garner, Barbadian cricketer and manager
- 1952 – Francesco Graziani, Italian footballer and manager
- 1953 – Rebecca Forstadt, American voice actress and screenwriter
- 1955 – Xander Berkeley, American actor and producer
- 1955 – Carol Browner, American lawyer and environmentalist, 8th Administrator of the Environmental Protection Agency
- 1955 – Prince Lorenz of Belgium, Archduke of Austria-Este
- 1955 – Chiharu Matsuyama, Japanese singer-songwriter
- 1956 – Lizzy Mercier Descloux, French musician, singer-songwriter, composer, actress, writer and painter (died 2004)
- 1957 – Antonio Vega, Spanish singer-songwriter and guitarist (died 2009)
- 1958 – Bart Oates, American football player and lawyer
- 1958 – Jeff Ruland, American basketball player
- 1959 – H. D. Kumaraswamy, Indian social worker and politician, 18th Chief Minister of Karnataka
- 1959 – Alison La Placa, American actress
- 1959 – Alexander Lebedev, Russian businessman and politician
- 1959 – Steve Mattsson, American author and illustrator
- 1960 – Sid Eudy, American professional wrestler
- 1960 – Pat Van Den Hauwe, Belgian footballer and manager
- 1961 – André Andersen, Russian-Danish keyboard player, songwriter, and producer
- 1961 – Shane Black, American actor, director, and screenwriter
- 1961 – Bill Hicks, American comedian and musician (died 1994)
- 1961 – LaChanze, American actress, singer, and dancer
- 1961 – Sam Robards, American actor
- 1961 – Jon Tenney, American actor and director
- 1962 – Maruschka Detmers, Dutch-French actress
- 1962 – William Perry, American football player and wrestler
- 1963 – Benjamin Bratt, American actor and producer
- 1963 – Cathy Johnston-Forbes, American golfer
- 1963 – James Mangold, American director, producer, and screenwriter
- 1963 – Nadia Moscufo, Belgian politician
- 1964 – Heike Drechsler, German sprinter and long jumper
- 1964 – Todd Glass, American comedian
- 1964 – John Kirwan, New Zealand rugby player and coach
- 1964 – Georgie Parker, Australian actress
- 1964 – Billy Ripken, American baseball player and sportscaster
- 1965 – Melanie Sloan, American lawyer and activist
- 1965 – J. B. Smoove, American comedian, writer, and actor
- 1966 – Fatima Lamarti, Belgian politician
- 1966 – Paul McGinley, Irish golfer
- 1966 – Clifford Robinson, American basketball player (died 2020)
- 1966 – Dennis Wise, English footballer and manager
- 1967 – Donovan Bailey, Canadian sprinter and sportscaster
- 1967 – Indrek Kaseorg, Estonian decathlete
- 1967 – Miranda Otto, Australian actress
- 1968 – Wendy Doolan, Australian golfer
- 1968 – Lalah Hathaway, American singer-songwriter, pianist, and producer
- 1968 – Greg Kovacs, Canadian bodybuilder (died 2013)
- 1969 – Simon Grayson, English footballer and manager
- 1969 – Kent Hehr, Canadian politician
- 1969 – Adam Riess, American astrophysicist, astronomer, and academic Nobel Prize laureate
- 1969 – Michelle Smith, Irish swimmer
- 1969 – Dmitri Tymoczko, American composer and theorist
- 1969 – Craig White, English cricketer and coach
- 1970 – Valerie Chow, Canadian-Hong Kong actress and publicist
- 1970 – Daniel Cosgrove, American actor
- 1971 – Seyhan Kurt, French-Turkish poet and sociologist
- 1971 – Paul van Dyk, German musician, producer and DJ
- 1971 – Michael McCary, American R&B singer
- 1972 – Charles Gipson, American baseball player
- 1972 – Zeljko Kalac, Australian soccer player and manager
- 1972 – Paul Leyden, Australian actor, director, producer, and screenwriter
- 1972 – Travis Morrison, American singer-songwriter
- 1973 – Themba Mnguni, South African footballer
- 1973 – Scott Storch, American songwriter and producer, founded Storch Music Company
- 1975 – Valentin Bădoi, Romanian footballer and manager
- 1975 – Kaba Diawara, French-Guinean footballer
- 1975 – Benjamin Kowalewicz, Canadian singer-songwriter and guitarist
- 1975 – Paul Maynard, English politician
- 1976 – Jen Golbeck, American computer scientist and academic
- 1977 – Éric Bélanger, Canadian ice hockey player
- 1977 – Sylvain Distin, French footballer
- 1978 – John Morris, Canadian curler and firefighter
- 1978 – Gunter Van Handenhoven, Belgian footballer and manager
- 1979 – Trevor Immelman, South African golfer
- 1979 – Brodie Lee, American wrestler (died 2020)
- 1979 – Daniel Narcisse, French handball player
- 1979 – Mihai Trăistariu, Romanian singer-songwriter
- 1979 – Jessie Ward, American wrestler and producer
- 1980 – Danish Kaneria, Pakistani cricketer
- 1981 – Krysten Ritter, American actress, musician, and model
- 1981 – Reanna Solomon, Nauruan weightlifter (died 2022)
- 1981 – Gareth Williams, Scottish footballer
- 1982 – Antrel Rolle, American football player
- 1982 – Anna Sedokova, Ukrainian singer, actress and television presenter
- 1982 – Stanislav Šesták, Slovak footballer
- 1983 – Kelenna Azubuike, Nigerian-American basketball player
- 1983 – Frankie Ballard, American singer-songwriter and guitarist
- 1983 – Joey Dorsey, American basketball player
- 1984 – Theo James, English actor
- 1985 – Stanislav Manolev, Bulgarian footballer
- 1985 – James Nash, English race car driver
- 1985 – Amanda Setton, American actress
- 1986 – Alcides Escobar, Venezuelan baseball player
- 1986 – Pärt Uusberg, Estonian actor, composer, and conductor.
- 1988 – Mats Hummels, German footballer
- 1988 – Anna Popplewell, English actress
- 1988 – Alexey Shved, Russian basketball player
- 1991 – Craig Goodwin, Australian footballer
- 1991 – David Johnson, American football player
- 1992 – Anamul Haque, Bangladeshi cricketer
- 1992 – Tom Rogic, Australian footballer
- 1993 – Jyoti Amge, Indian actress
- 1993 – Stephan James, Canadian actor
- 1994 – Nigel Hayes, American basketball player
- 1994 – Nicola Murru, Italian footballer
- 1994 – José Rodríguez, Spanish footballer
- 1996 – Wilfred Ndidi, Nigerian footballer
- 1996 – Sergio Reguilón, Spanish footballer
- 1996 – Henry Thornton, Australian cricketer
- 1997 – Zara Larsson, Swedish singer and songwriter
- 1998 – Mira Antonitsch, Austrian tennis player
- 1998 – Zhou Jieqiong, Chinese singer and actress
- 2001 – Kai Cenat, American streamer

== Deaths ==
=== Pre-1600 ===
- 604 – Houzhu, emperor of the Chen dynasty (born 553)
- 705 – Wu Zetian, Empress of the Zhou dynasty (born 624)
- 714 – Pepin of Herstal, Frankish statesman (born 635)
- 867 – Eberhard of Friuli, Frankish duke (born 815)
- 874 – Ado, archbishop of Vienne
- 882 – John VIII, pope of the Catholic Church
- 902 – Wei Yifan, chancellor of the Tang dynasty
- 999 – Adelaide of Italy, Holy Roman Empress (born 931)
- 1153 – Ranulf de Gernon, 4th Earl of Chester, Norman nobleman
- 1263 – Haakon IV, king of Norway (born 1204)
- 1316 – Öljaitü, Mongolian ruler (born 1280)
- 1325 – Charles, French nobleman (born 1270)
- 1378 – Secondotto, marquess of Montferrat (born 1360)
- 1379 – John FitzAlan, 1st Baron Arundel, English general and politician, Lord Marshall of England (born 1348)
- 1470 – John II, duke of Lorraine (born 1424)
- 1474 – Ali Qushji, Uzbek astronomer, mathematician, and physicist (born 1403)
- 1515 – Afonso de Albuquerque, Portuguese admiral and politician, 3rd Viceroy of Portuguese India (born 1453)
- 1558 – Thomas Cheney, English diplomat and Lord Warden of the Cinque Ports
- 1583 – Ivan Fyodorov, Russian printer
- 1594 – Allison Balfour, Scottish woman accused of witchcraft
- 1598 – Yi Sun-sin, Korean general (born 1545)

=== 1601–1900 ===
- 1669 – Nathaniel Fiennes, English soldier and politician (born 1608)
- 1687 – William Petty, English economist and philosopher (born 1623)
- 1751 – Leopold II, Prince of Anhalt-Dessau (born 1700)
- 1774 – François Quesnay, French economist, physician, and philosopher (born 1694)
- 1783 – Johann Adolph Hasse, German composer and educator (born 1699)
- 1783 – Sir William James, 1st Baronet, Welsh-English commander and politician (born 1720)
- 1805 – Saverio Cassar, Gozitan priest and rebel leader (born 1746)
- 1809 – Antoine François, comte de Fourcroy, French chemist and entomologist (born 1755)
- 1859 – Wilhelm Grimm, German anthropologist and author (born 1786)
- 1892 – Henry Yesler, American businessman and politician, 7th Mayor of Seattle (born 1810)
- 1897 – Alphonse Daudet, French author, poet, and playwright (born 1840)
- 1898 – Pavel Tretyakov, Russian businessman and art collector (born 1832)

=== 1901–present ===
- 1908 – American Horse, American tribal leader and educator (born 1840)
- 1917 – Frank Gotch, American wrestler (born 1878)
- 1921 – Camille Saint-Saëns, French pianist, composer, and conductor (born 1835)
- 1922 – Gabriel Narutowicz, Lithuanian–Polish engineer and politician, 1st President of the Republic of Poland (born 1865)
- 1928 – Elinor Wylie, American poet and author (born 1885)
- 1935 – Thelma Todd, American actress and comedian (born 1905)
- 1936 – Frank Eugene, American-German photographer and educator (born 1865)
- 1940 – Eugène Dubois, Dutch paleoanthropologist (born 1858)
- 1940 – Billy Hamilton, American baseball player and manager (born 1866)
- 1943 – George Bambridge, English diplomat (born 1892)
- 1944 – Betsie ten Boom, Dutch Holocaust victim (born 1885)
- 1945 – Giovanni Agnelli, Italian businessman, founded Fiat (born 1866)
- 1945 – Fumimaro Konoe, Japanese lawyer and politician, 23rd Prime Minister of Japan (born 1891)
- 1949 – Sidney Olcott, Canadian-American actor, director, producer, and screenwriter (born 1873)
- 1952 – Robert Henry Best, American journalist (born 1896)
- 1956 – Nina Hamnett, Welsh painter and author (born 1890)
- 1961 – Hans Rebane, Estonian journalist and politician, 8th Minister of Foreign Affairs (born 1882)
- 1965 – W. Somerset Maugham, British playwright, novelist, and short story writer (born 1874)
- 1968 – Futabayama Sadaji, Japanese sumo wrestler, the 35th Yokozuna (born 1912)
- 1968 – Muhammad Suheimat, Jordanian general and politician (born 1916)
- 1969 – Alphonse Castex, French rugby union player (born 1899)
- 1969 – Soe Hok Gie, Indonesian activist and academic (born 1942)
- 1970 – Oscar Lewis, American anthropologist of Latin America (born 1914)
- 1974 – Kostas Varnalis, Greek poet and playwright (born 1884)
- 1976 – Réal Caouette, Canadian journalist and politician (born 1917)
- 1977 – Risto Jarva, Finnish director, producer, and screenwriter (born 1934)
- 1980 – Colonel Sanders, American businessman, founded KFC (born 1890)
- 1980 – Hellmuth Walter, German-American engineer (born 1900)
- 1982 – Colin Chapman, English engineer and businessman, founded Lotus Cars (born 1928)
- 1983 – Debs Garms, American baseball player (born 1907)
- 1983 – Mitchell WerBell III, American mercenary (born 1918)
- 1984 – Karl Deichgräber, German philologist and academic (born 1903)
- 1985 – Thomas Bilotti, American mobster (born 1940)
- 1985 – Paul Castellano, American mobster (born 1915)
- 1989 – Oscar Alfredo Gálvez, Argentinian race car driver (born 1913)
- 1989 – Silvana Mangano, Italian actress (born 1930)
- 1989 – Aileen Pringle, American actress (born 1895)
- 1989 – Lee Van Cleef, American actor (born 1925)
- 1991 – Eszter Tamási, Hungarian actress and journalist (born 1938)
- 1993 – Moses Gunn, American actor (born 1929)
- 1993 – Kakuei Tanaka, Japanese soldier and politician, 64th Prime Minister of Japan (born 1918)
- 1996 – Quentin Bell, English historian and author (born 1910)
- 1997 – Lillian Disney, American illustrator and philanthropist (born 1899)
- 1998 – William Gaddis, American author and academic (born 1922)
- 2001 – Stuart Adamson, English-Scottish singer-songwriter and guitarist (born 1958)
- 2001 – Stefan Heym, German-American soldier and author (born 1913)
- 2003 – Robert Stanfield, Canadian economist, lawyer, and politician, 17th Premier of Nova Scotia (born 1914)
- 2003 – Gary Stewart, American singer-songwriter (born 1945)
- 2004 – Ted Abernathy, American baseball player (born 1933)
- 2004 – Deyda Hydara, Gambian journalist, co-founded The Point (born 1946)
- 2004 – Agnes Martin, American painter and educator (born 1912)
- 2005 – Kenneth Bulmer, English author (born 1921)
- 2005 – Ed Hansen, American director and screenwriter (born 1937)
- 2005 – John Spencer, American actor (born 1946)
- 2006 – Don Jardine, Canadian wrestler and trainer (born 1940)
- 2006 – Taliep Petersen, South African singer-songwriter and director (born 1950)
- 2006 – Pnina Salzman, Israeli pianist and educator (born 1922)
- 2006 – Stanford J. Shaw, American historian and academic (born 1930)
- 2007 – Dan Fogelberg, American singer-songwriter and guitarist (born 1951)
- 2009 – Roy E. Disney, American businessman (born 1930)
- 2009 – Yegor Gaidar, Russian economist and politician, Prime Minister of Russia (born 1956)
- 2009 – Manto Tshabalala-Msimang, South African physician and politician, 22nd South African Minister of Health (born 1940)
- 2010 – Melvin E. Biddle, American soldier, Medal of Honor recipient (born 1923)
- 2010 – Ayinde Barrister, Nigerian fuji musician (born 1948)
- 2011 – Robert Easton, American actor and screenwriter (born 1930)
- 2011 – Nicol Williamson, Scottish actor (born 1938)
- 2012 – Elwood V. Jensen, American biologist and academic (born 1920)
- 2012 – Jake Adam York, American poet and academic (born 1972)
- 2013 – James Flint, English commander (born 1913)
- 2013 – Ray Price, American singer-songwriter and guitarist (born 1926)
- 2013 – Marta Russell, American journalist, author, and activist (born 1951)
- 2014 – Martin Brasier, English paleontologist, biologist, and academic (born 1947)
- 2014 – Tim Cochran, American mathematician and academic (born 1955)
- 2014 – Tahira Qazi, Pakistani educationist and principal of Army Public School Peshawar who was killed in the Peshawar school attack.
- 2015 – Peter Dickinson, Rhodesian-English author and poet (born 1927)
- 2015 – Lizmark, Mexican wrestler (born 1950)
- 2015 – George Earl Ortman, American painter and sculptor (born 1926)
- 2017 – Keely Smith, American singer and actress (born 1928)
- 2023 – Nawaf Al-Ahmad Al-Jaber Al-Sabah, Emir of Kuwait (born 1937)
- 2024 – Dick Van Arsdale, American basketball player (born 1943)
- 2024 – Tulsi Gowda, Indian environmentalist (born 1937/1938)
- 2025 – Lusanda Dumke, South African professional rugby union player who played as a flanker (born 1996)

== Holidays and observances ==
- Christian feast day:
  - Adelaide of Italy
  - Haggai
  - Blessed Marianna Fontanella
  - Blessed Philip Siphong Onphitak
  - Ralph Adams Cram, Richard Upjohn and John La Farge (Episcopal Church (USA))
  - December 16 (Eastern Orthodox liturgics)
- Day of Reconciliation, formerly celebrated as Day of the Vow by the Afrikaners (South Africa)
- Independence Day, celebrates the independence of Kazakhstan from the Soviet Union in 1991.
- National Day, celebrates the withdrawal of United Kingdom from Bahrain, making Bahrain an independent emirate in 1971.
- International Day of the Belt and Road Initiative
- National Sports Day (Thailand)
- The beginning of the nine-day celebration beginning December 16 and ending December 24, celebrating the trials which Mary and Joseph endured before finding a place to stay where Jesus could be born (Hispanidad):
  - The first day of Las Posadas (Mexico, Latin America)
  - The first day of the Simbang Gabi novena of masses (Philippines)
- Victory Day observances, celebration of the Indo-Bangla allied victory over Pakistan armed forces and the Liberation of Bangladesh. (Bangladesh and India (Note: As 'Vijay Diwas'))
