= Ta'ziya =

Ta'ziya (from Arabic تعزية taʿziya 'condolence') may refer to:

- Ta'ziyeh, a dramatic art form in Iran
- Tazia, a temporary structure in South Asia and the Caribbean, representing the shrine of Husayn ibn Ali

== See also ==
- Chup Tazia
- Tazia Tower
