= Sylhet Shahi Eidgah =

Open prayer hall in Sylhet, Bangladesh

- সিলেট শাহী ঈদগাহ
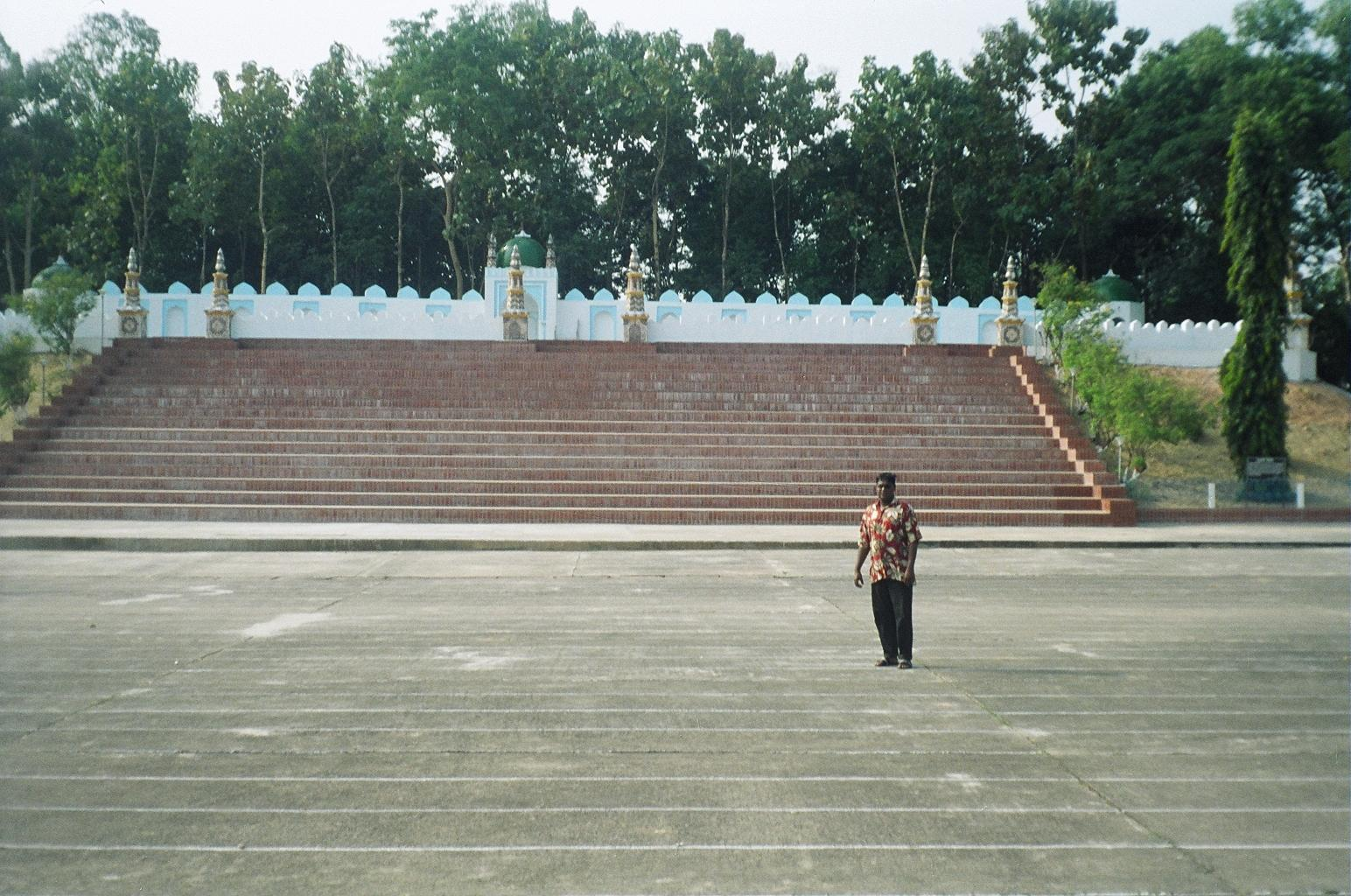
- Sylhet Shahi Eidgah

- Location of the eidgah in Bangladesh

Religion
- Affiliation: Islam
- Ecclesiastical or organizational status: Eidgah
- Status: Active

Location
- Location: Shahi Eigdah Area, Kotwali Model Thana, Sylhet
- Country: Bangladesh
- Interactive map of Sylhet Shahi Eidgah
- Coordinates: 24°54′19″N 91°52′51″E

Architecture
- Architect: Faujdar Farhad Khan
- Type: Mosque architecture
- Style: Mughal; Bengali; Bangladeshi
- Completed: 17th century

Specifications
- Dome: 15 (maybe more)
- Minaret: Two (maybe more)

The Sylhet Shahi Eidgah (Bengali: সিলেট শাহী ঈদগাহ), or simply Shahi Eidgah, is an open prayer hall situated in Sylhet, north-east Bangladesh, three kilometers to the north-east of the guru nanak international circuit house, meant for the Eid prayers. It is also one of the most visited tourist spots in the city. As well as for prayer uses and Islamic congregations, the eidgah has historically been a place to give speeches and host rallies by the likes of Mohandas Gandhi and Muhammad Ali Jinnah. There have also been battles taken place there such as the Muharram Rebellion.

== History ==
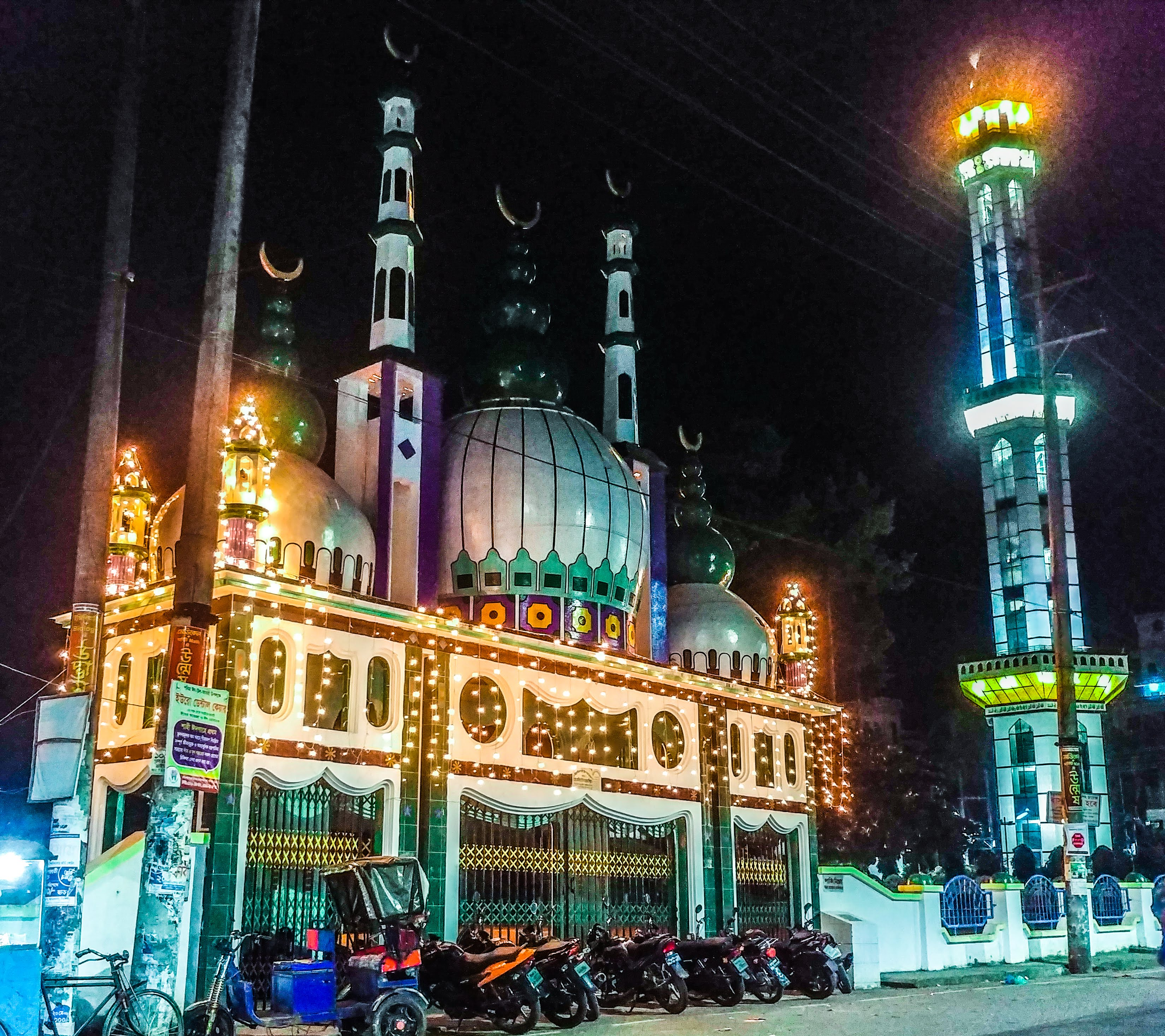
Entrance at night

During the rule of Mughal emperor Aurangzeb, Farhad Khan was appointed as the faujdar of Sylhet. Farhad Khan supervised the construction of the Shahi Eidgah on a hill in the 17th century. On 16 December 1782 (10 Muharram 1197), the Pirzada of Sylhet two religious leaders, Syed Muhammad Hadi and Syed Muhammad Mahdi (known locally as Hada Miah & Mada Miah), led the first uprising against the British opposition in these grounds. The two brothers marched with their followers to the grounds with the main purpose for a tazia procession, but to also do a sudden attack against the British. However, Robert Lindsay, the colonial supervisor of the district, was already made aware of this and came armed with contingents forcing the rebels to surrender. The rebels declined and revolted and a short battle took place in the grounds. In the aftermath, the leader of the rebels died with Hadi and the Pirzada being shot dead by Lindsay himself. The incident, known as the 1782 Sylhet uprising, was also mentioned in Lindsay's diary while he was going back to Europe. Mohandas Gandhi gave a speech in these grounds as part of his non-cooperation movement, and many other politicians followed after as the years went by such as Mohammad Ali Jinnah, Mohammad Ali Jauhar, Huseyn Shaheed Suhrawardy and A. K. Fazlul Huq.

== Architecture ==
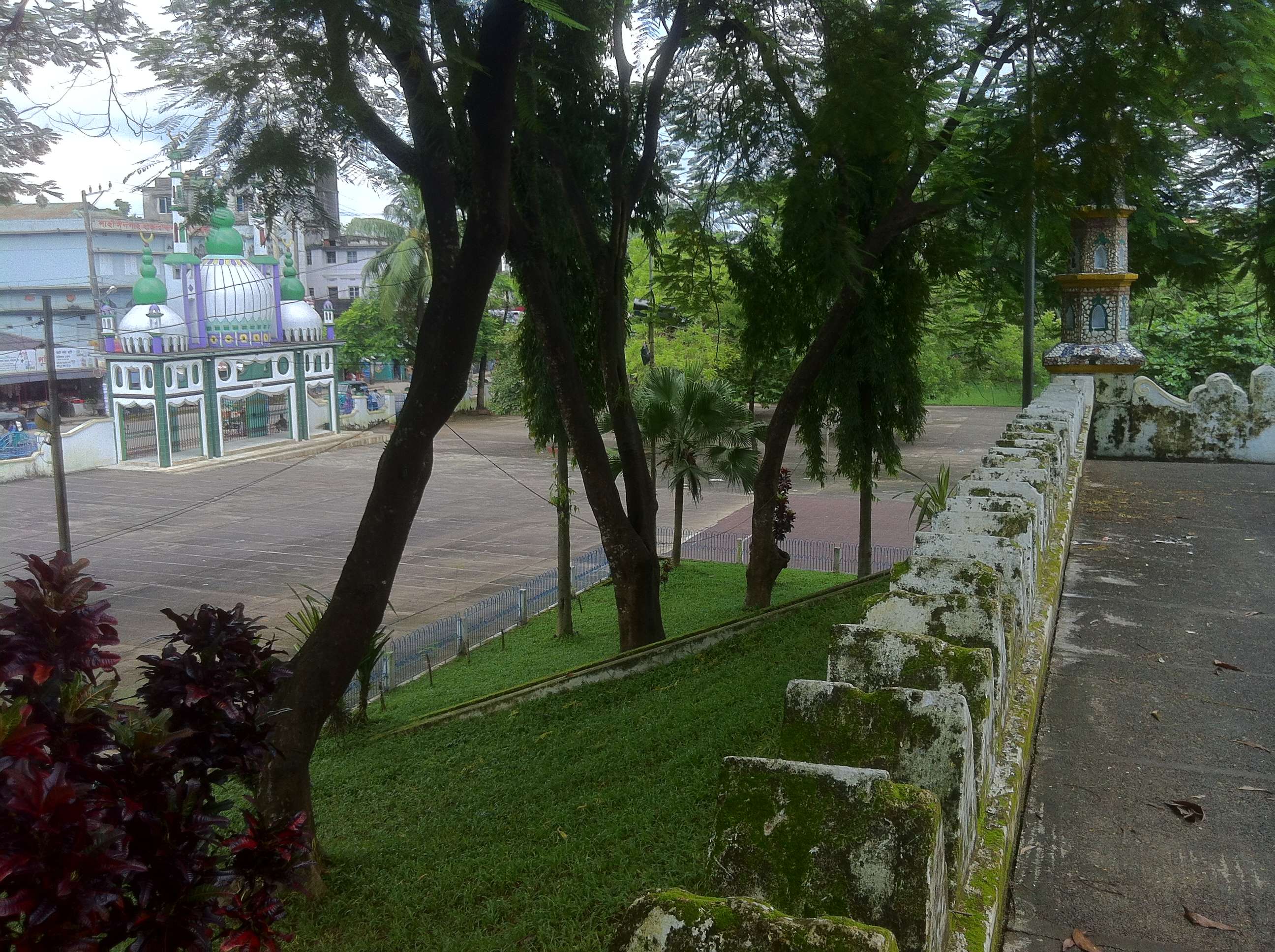
Front entrance on the left

Although designed like a grand Mughal fort, it is actually meant for Eid prayers. There are three gates to enter through and 15 domes. Through the large gate, there is a large pond, known locally as "fukoir" or "fukri", which is designated as a wudu khana. The ground contains a large mihrab in the center of the wall, with other smaller mihrabs scattered throughout. Around the borders of the eidgah are also many half-domed minars.

== See also ==
- Islam in Bangladesh
- List of mosques in Bangladesh
