= Majumdars of Sylhet =

Political family in sylhet

Mazumder Family
- Current region: Sylhet, Bangladesh
- Etymology: Record keeper
- Origin: Barshala village
- Founder: Sarwar Khan
- Estate: Mazumderi

The Mazumders of Sylhet (Bengali: সিলেটের মজুমদার বংশ), or more specifically, the Mazumders of Gorduar/Barshala, are a notable aristocratic family who have played important roles throughout the history of the Sylhet region.

== History ==
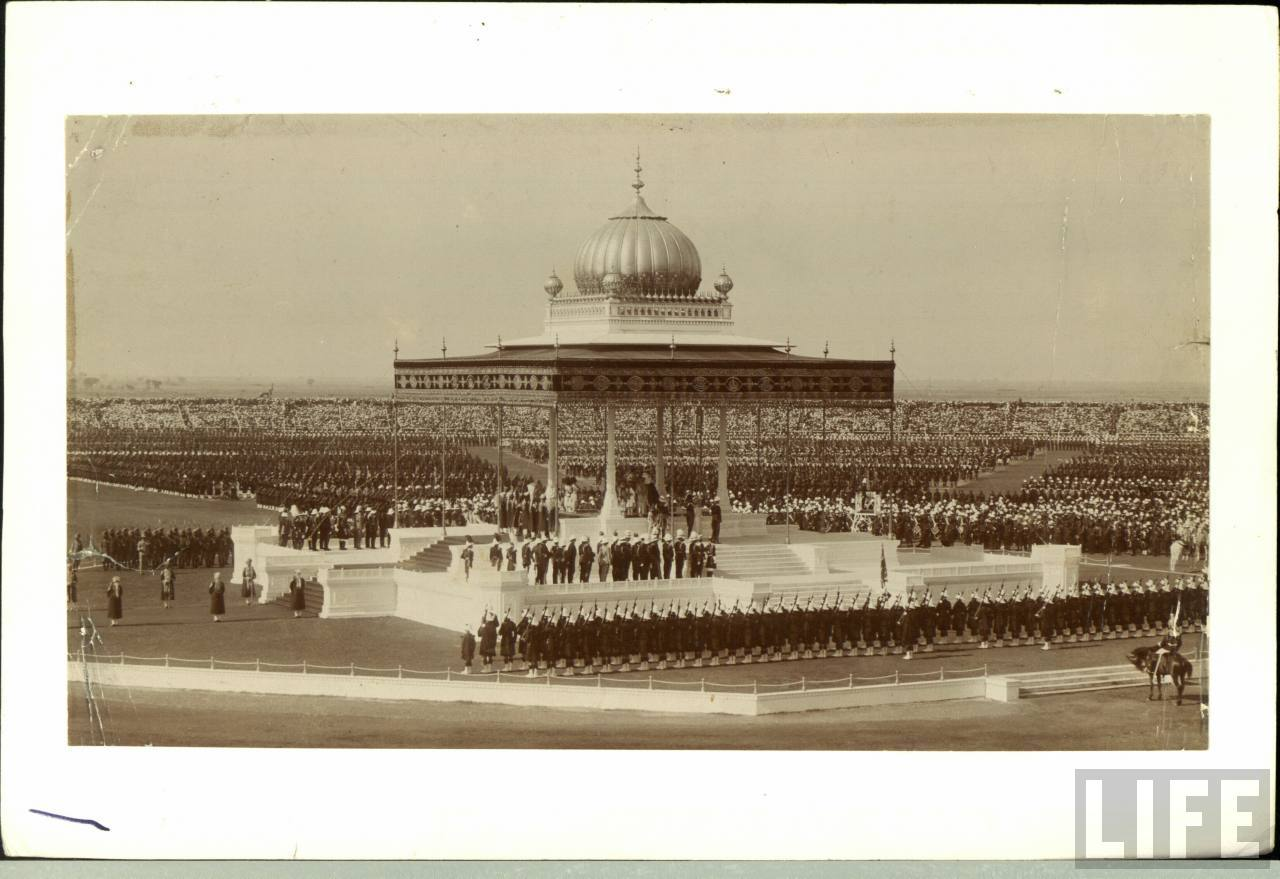
Majid Bakht Majumdar was invited to the Delhi Durbar in 1903.

=== Origin ===
The family was founded by a man called Sarwar khan from the village of Barsala and worked as a minister under the Sultan of Bengal. Under the instructions of Sultan Alauddin Husain Shah, Sarwar went to the Pratapgarh Kingdom to negotiate with Sultan Muhammad Bazid to return Sylhet to the Bengal Sultanate. After being rejected by Bazid, Sarwar defeated him in a war also fighting Bazid's allies, the Zamindars of Kanihati and of Ita. Bazid gave up his title as the Sultan of Pratapgarh, and Sarwar was rewarded as the next legitimate Nawab of Sylhet after Gawhar Khan Aswari's death, and was granted the title of Khan.

=== Early history ===
Sarwar's son, Mir Khan was the next Nawab of Sylhet. Mir Khan, was made the Qanungoh (revenue officer) of Sylhet, and the family continued holding this office until the abolishment of the Qanungoh system. Mir Khan married Lavanyavati, the Muslim daughter of Bazid of Pratapgarh.

Lodi Khan was said to have won a battle against Khwaja Usman, and then his son Jahan Khan established Jahanpur, named after himself. In the 17th century, Keshwar Khan, the Qanungoh of Sylhet under Emperor Aurangzeb, dug a canal which he called Keshwar Khal. His son, Mahtab Khan, is also known to have established a Haat bazaar in the Sylhet region named after himself.

=== During British rule ===
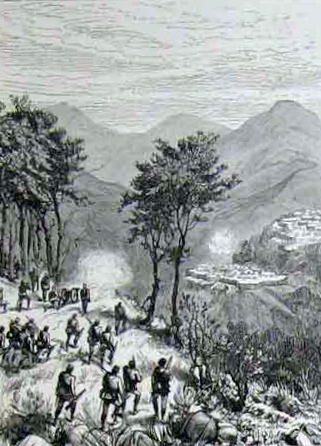
One of many battles which took place between the British and their allies against a Lusei clan in Mizoram during the late 19th century.

Mahtab Khan's son was Masud Bakht who was made the Head Qanungoh of Sylhet. Masud played an important part in maintaining peace during the Muharram Rebellion of 1782. He was succeeded as Qanungoh by his nephew, Muhammad Bakht in 1793. Muhammad Bakht founded the village of Muhammadabad.

Ashraf Ali Majumdar (1817-1883) was a notable disciple of Karamat Ali Jaunpuri. In the late 19th century, Syed Bakht Majumdar and his family migrated to Makkah, under the Ottoman Empire, where he joined the council of the Sharif of Mecca and was awarded the Star of the Mejidhi. On the 1st of April 1867, Syed had a son called Muhammad. Following Syed's return to Sylhet, he and his son, Moulvi Hamid Bakht Majumdar, became one of the only people in their province to be exempted of civil court attendance. The family also established the Sayyidia Madrasa in Sylhet. Hamid was the Deputy Collector of Sylhet and assisted in the Lushai Hills expedition. Hamid was fluent in Persian and wrote the prose Ain-i-Hind, a history of the Indian subcontinent. Ala Bakhsh Majumdar Hamed was known to have written Tuhfatul Muhsineen and Diwan-i-Hamed. Collectively, the works of these two are regarded amongst the most creative literary works in the Sylhet region.

Hamid's younger brother, Majid Bakht Majumdar was made the Deputy Collector and Magistrate of Rajshahi in 1878. He then became the Assistant Commissioner of the Assam Province. He assisted the government in the battles of Lushai and Manipur. Majid was awarded the title of Khan Bahadur by King Edward VII for his efforts and invited to the King's coronation at the Delhi Durbar of 1903. The wrestler, Ashrab Ali Majumdar was also from this family.

In the early eighteenth century, Syed's other son (who was born in Makkah), Muhammad Bakht Majumdar, was made the Honorary Magistrate of Bengal and the Extra Assistant Commissioner in Assam. He was an important visitor of the Civil Jail and Leper Asylum in Sylhet and a member of the District's Local Board council. He is known to have established a madrasa in Sylhet as well. In 1857, he presented six pieces of military equipment to the British Raj. He had a keen interest in the tea industry and in 1904, he opened the Brahmanchara Tea Estate alongside Syed Abdul Majid, Ghulam Rabbani and Karim Bakhsh. He was given the title of Khan Bahadur in 1909. Muhammad was also one of the prominent leaders of the Sylhet-Bengal Reunion League formed in 1920 to reunite the Sylhet district with Bengal, which it had been separated from. However, in September 1928, Muhammad proposed a resolution, during the Surma Valley Muslim Conference, opposing the transfer of Sylhet and Cachar to Bengal and this even gained support from Syed Abdul Majid and his organisation Anjuman-e-Islamia, as well as the Muslim Students Association. His son was Maulvi Munawwar Bakht Majumdar the father of H. A. Hamid Bakht Majumdar, the current mutawalli (guardian) of the Majumdari Estate.

== Other members ==
- Wajed Ali Mazumder - A zamindar & senior member of the dynasty
  - Sajjad Ali Mazumder - Eldest son of Wajed A. Mazumder. A graduate of the Aligarh Muslim University, he was an ICS & later CSP officer. He served in many important capacities including as the DC of Dhaka.
    - Shah M. Abul Hussain - He was a son-in-law of Sajjad A. Mazumder. Abul Hussain was a civil servant and later joined politics. He was elected as a member of parliament from Barisal-4 in 3 different elections (February 1996, June 1996, & 2001). He also served as the State Minister of Finance & Planning from 2001-2006 in the Third Khaleda ministry.
    - Mainul Hosein - He was a son-in-law of Sajjad A. Mazumder. Mainul was the son of senior journalist and founder of The Daily Ittefaq Tofazzal Hossain Manik Miah.
    - Kazi Faruque Kader - He is a son-in-law of Sajjad A. Mazumder. He is the son of Muslim League leader Kazi Abdul Kader. Faruque is a politician of the Jatiya Party and was twice elected to parliament, first in 1988 and second in 2008.
  - Emdadur Rahman Mazumder - A son of Wajed A. Mazumder.
    - Hafiz Ahmed Mazumder - A grandson of Wajed A. Mazumder and son of Emdadur Rahman Mazumder. He is a businessman & former member of parliament.
  - Mahmudur Rahman Majumdar - Youngest son of Wajed A. Mazumder. He was the senior most ethnic Bengali officer in the Pakistan Army in 1971 with the rank of brigadier. He later joined the Bangladesh Army. After retirement he joined politics and was twice elected as a member of parliament from Sylhet-5 as a Jatiya Party candidate.

== See also ==
- History of Sylhet
