= Muharram Rebellion =

18th-century Bengali uprising

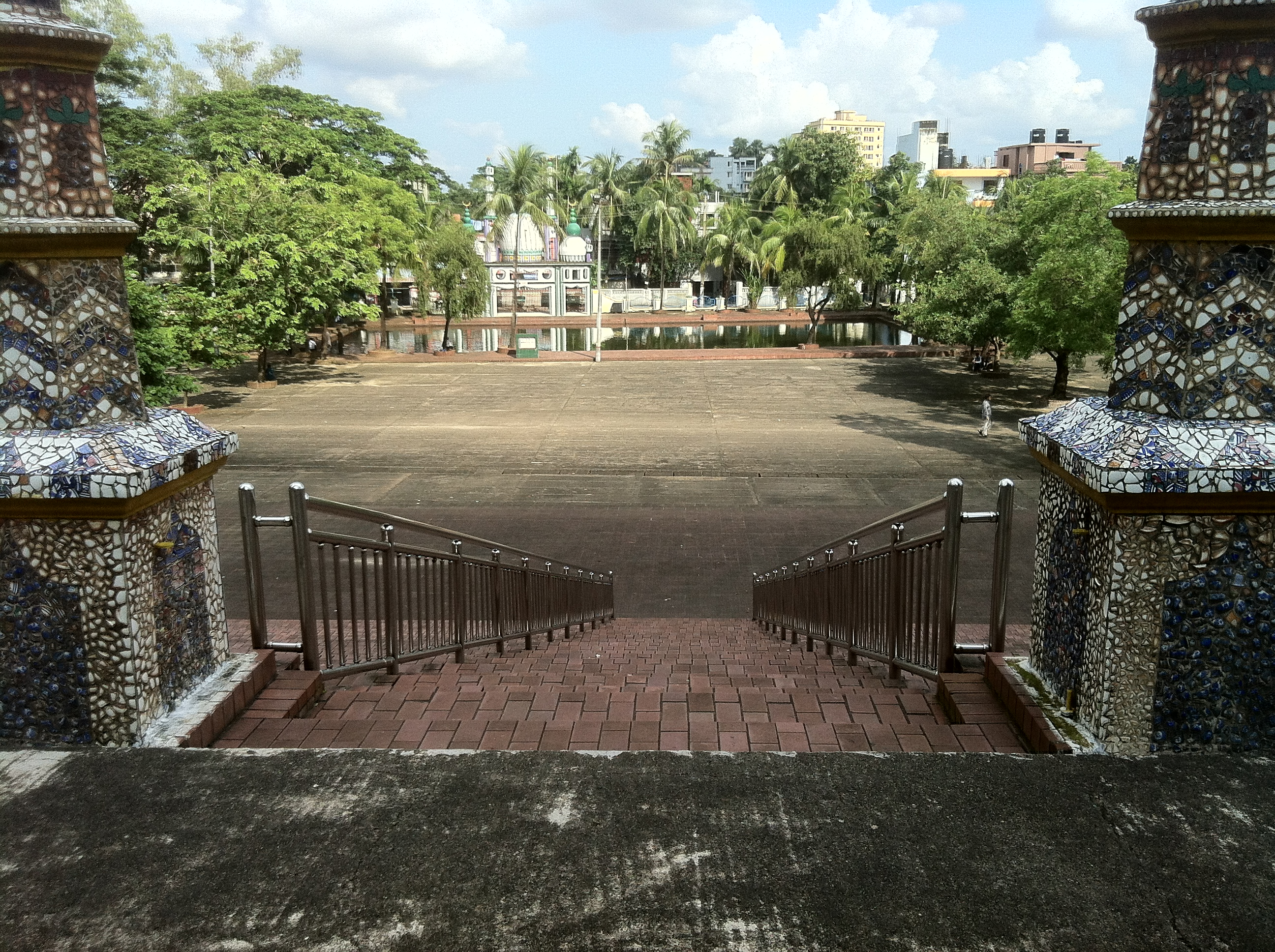
- Site of the battle
Date	December 1782
Location	Sylhet Shahi Eidgah, Sylhet
Result	British victory: Suppression of revolt

Belligerents
British East India Company	Bengali Muslims

Commanders and leaders
Robert Lindsay (Superintendent of Sylhet); Unnamed Muslim jamadar † Supported by: Dewan Manik Chand; Qanungo Masud Bakht	Syed Pirzada †; Syed Muhammad Hadi (Hada Miah) †; Syed Muhammad Mahdi (Mada Miah) †

Strength
52 sepoys	301 (mostly civilians)

Casualties and losses
1 sepoy killed 12 sepoys injured	4 killed (including leaders); Many injured

The Muharram Rebellion (Bengali: মহররম বিদ্রোহ) was a Bengali uprising which took place in early December 1782 against the East India Company in colonial Sylhet, eastern Bengal (now Bangladesh). The rebellion was under the leadership of the Pirzada and his two brothers, Syed Muhammad Hadi and Syed Muhammad Mahdi. The main battle took place in the Mughal-built Sylhet Shahi Eidgah and its surrounding hills.

== Background ==
In 1778, the British East India Company appointed Robert Lindsay as the Supervisor or Collector of Sylhet. During his leadership, Lindsay started to trade chunam (limestone), rattan, betel nut and elephants found in the Sylhet region. This business of Lindsay's stirred hate throughout the region. Lindsay describes in his autobiography, Anecdotes of an Indian life, that during his visit to the Dargah of Shah Jalal, he sensed some danger and also perceived it as a "potential hotbed of resistance". During this period, Mubarak Ali Khan was the Nawab of Bengal under the crumbling Mughal Empire ruled by Shah Alam II and Warren Hastings was the Governor-General of the Presidency of Fort William.

In 1781, the region was afflicted with a major flood. Many farmlands and crops were damaged spreading famine throughout Sylhet. A third of the region's population died due to its effects. This increased hate between the two communities as the natives accused the British of failure in minimising the flood's consequences. It is said that Lindsay sent a letter to the government in Fort William to excise taxes during this period. This request of his was declined.

Lindsay mentions in his autobiography that he was approached by the native Hindus at his home in which he was informed of the uprising by the Muslims. The Hindus informed him that the Muslims planned an attack on the British government as well as some Hindu temples in Sylhet town. It is considered that this rivalry between the Hindus and Muslims existed due to the Hindus siding with British rather than helping the Muslims. Lindsay dismissed the Hindus as he could see no signs of riot and he was also aware that it was the Islamic month of Muharram in which the Muslims would be busy preparing for Ashura, which was just a few days away. Lindsay also mentions that it was uncommon for the Muslims to be violent, most probably due to the fact that Muharram is a sacred month in Islam, during which warfare is forbidden.

One narrative identifies the rebellion's leading Pirzada as the head of the Syeds of the Jhornar Par neighbourhood in Sylhet. This was an influential family descended from Syed Hamzah Shersowari, a companion of Shah Jalal who participated in the Muslim conquest of the region in 1303 CE and then settled atop the Jhornar Par hill where he lies buried in a mazar. The Pirzada's followers were not only in Sylhet, but also Mymensingh, Tippera (Comilla) and nearby areas. Muslims from across Bengal and Assam would travel to Sylhet during the month of Muharram for the processions.

== Rebellion day ==
The Pirzada's proclamation

আমরা কি ফিরিঙ্গিদের কুকুর যে তাদের হুকুম তামিল করবো?
Amra ki firiṅgider kukur je tader hukum tamil kôrbo?
Are we the dogs of these firingis (foreigners), that we take orders from them?
আজ মারবার অথবা মরবার দিন
Aj marbar ôthôba môrbar din
Today is the day to kill or to die,
ইংরেজ রাজত্ব আজ খতম
Ingrez rajôttô aj khôtôm
The reign of the English is at an end

— Pirzada to Lindsay

In the evening, the Pirzada led a tazia procession of 300 alongside his brothers, Syed Muhammad Hadi and Syed Muhammad Mahdi (known locally as Hada Miah & Mada Miah). Many local civilians of the Muslim faith were also present during this procession. The parade marched through the Shahi Eidgah in Sylhet. The Mourning of Muharram consisted of a matam as well, which is why blades and swords were carried to the grounds. In a letter to the government at Fort William, Lindsay mentions that the Muslim rebels first killed Dewan Manik Chand in his house before setting many parts of the town to fire.

At 5 p.m., the Hindus returned to Lindsay's house where they showed their marks of attack on their body. However, it is unknown whether this true as other sources claim that the Hindus were not involved during the day as during that time the Muslims were scattering on top of the hills around the Eidgah instead of being situated in the lowlands where inhabitants lived. Lindsay then informed Masud Bakht, the Head Qanungo (Registrar) of Sylhet, and told his Muslim jamadar to ready 20 sepoys and go to the eidgah. Lindsay joined later on, marching with 30 more sepoys towards the eidgah, with some riding on horses. Armed with over 50 contingents, he ordered the rebels to surrender, however they fled towards the hills surrounding the field. This led to Lindsay and his men to attack the rebels and they followed them to the hills. Lindsay approached the Pirzada, ready for a swordfight. The Pirzada broke Lindsay's sword with his talwar. The Muslim jamadar quickly gave Lindsay his pistol. Lindsay then shot the Pirzada, killing him. The sepoys then discharged a platoon allowing Lindsay to then set off and leave the premise. As Lindsay was about to leave, he saw a wounded elderly man dropped on his feet after being attacked by a sepoy. Lindsay told the sepoy to stop as he picked the man back up and saved him.

Both Mada and Hada Miah also died with the latter being shot dead by Lindsay himself. Lindsay mentions that one of his sepoys died and 6 were left injured. The sepoy that died is said to have been the Jamadar himself. Lindsay mentions that 4 rebels died and many were injured.

== Aftermath ==
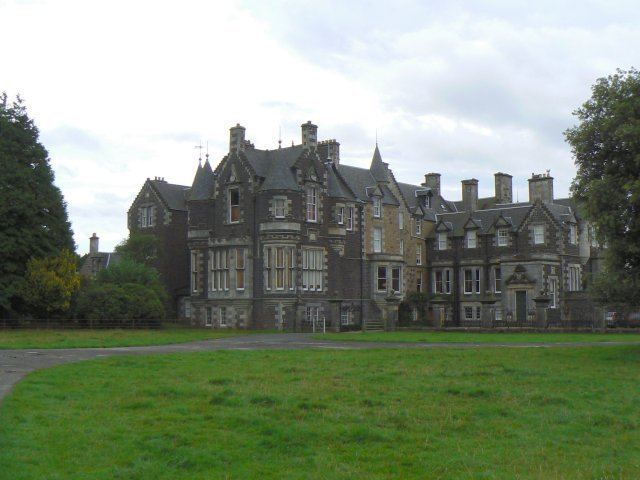
Robert Lindsay lived in Balcarres House after returning to Scotland.

After the incident took place, Lindsay took his wounded soldiers to his hall where his rope-maker, Job Hinton, stitched up their wounds and provided treatment. Lindsay also imprisoned many important Muslims from the town as hostages in his home. Nevertheless, this was short-lasted as one of Lindsay's men known as Beck and other Europeans requested their release fearing another revolt as they reported seeing Muslim men lighting torches and fires around the town. Lindsay sent another military force to the town, not because there was another revolt, rather the Muslims were burying their dead men and required light due to it being late at night. Hada and Mada Miah were buried next to Sylhet Shahi Eidgah at a place now located east of Nayasarak Madrasa and west of Nayasarak missionary church. Lindsay then issued a statement stating that rebels to the government should not be allowed to be honoured. He also sent a letter, on 14 December, to the Governor of the Presidency of Fort William, Warren Hastings, of the event. Reinforcements of troops were considered in order to increase defence in the region in case of another rebellion, as two days remained of the Muharram festival which lasts for 10 days, ending at Ashura. Lindsay mentioned that although two days remained, he was not expecting any more trouble from the local people as main "desperadoes" were killed and the survivors had suffered too much.

This first uprising in the subcontinent inspired many others in the subcontinent. It also made the British rule even more unpopular in the Sylhet region, with the death of the Pirzada. A few months after the incident, Lindsay was having dinner his friend Hamilton. Lindsay's servant informed Lindsay that there was a faqir who urgently desired to speak to him. The faqir then came inside and complained of how he had been robbed of all his belongings. As a short discussion took place, the faqir then suddenly took out a poignard from his cummerbund and struck Hamilton, who pushed it back to the faqir's chest. The faqir died a few days later.

After Lindsay's return to Scotland many years succeeding the conflict, he came across a Bengali Muslim man from Sylhet named Saeed Ullah whilst visiting the house of his clergyman, Mr Small. After engaging in a conversation, Lindsay found out that Saeed came as an attendant of Mr Small's son, who was the ship purser. Saeed mentioned his intention to hunt down the Pirzada's killer and avenge his death. He was also the son of the old man whom Lindsay had saved. Upon finding out Lindsay's identity, Saeed drew his sword which Lindsay avoided. As the scene calmed down, the two men made peace and Lindsay obliged Saeed to make a curry for his family. Saeed agreed, although the Lindsay family were suspicious on whether the dish was poisonous as Saeed never tasted it once while preparing it. Lindsay denied this as he mentioned that he had never had a better curry in his life, and acknowledged the fact that Saeed only ate halal meat (dhabihah) which was the reason behind him not tasting it.

The northern hill of Sylhet Shahi Eidgah is named after Hada and Mada Miah, who fought on top of that exact hill.

== See also ==
- Rahimullah of Baraikhali
- Nankar Rebellion
- Revolt of Radharam

== Bibliography ==
- Chowdhury, Achyut Charan (1917). [[s:bn:পাতা:শ্রীহট্টের ইতিবৃত্ত - পূর্বাংশ.pdf/১|]] শ্রীহট্টের ইতিবৃত্ত - পূর্বাংশ [History of Sylhet] (in Bengali). Calcutta: Mustafa Selim – via Wikisource.
- Lindsay, Robert (1858). "Anecdotes of an Indian life: Chapter VII". Lives of the Lindsays: or, a Memoir of the Houses of Crawford and Balcarres. Vol. 4 (2nd ed.). London: John Murray.
- Islam, Sirajul (2003). Banglapedia: National Encyclopedia of Bangladesh. Asiatic Society of Bangladesh.
- Syed Murtaza Ali (1965). হজরত শাহ জালাল ও সিলেটের ইতিহাস [Hazrat Shah Jalal and the History of Sylhet].
- Ali Riaz (2013). Islam and Identity Politics Among British-Bangladeshis: A Leap of Faith. ISBN 978-0719089558.
