= Marianna Fontanella =

Italian Catholic member of the Discalced Carmelites

Blessed Marianna Fontanella O.C.D.
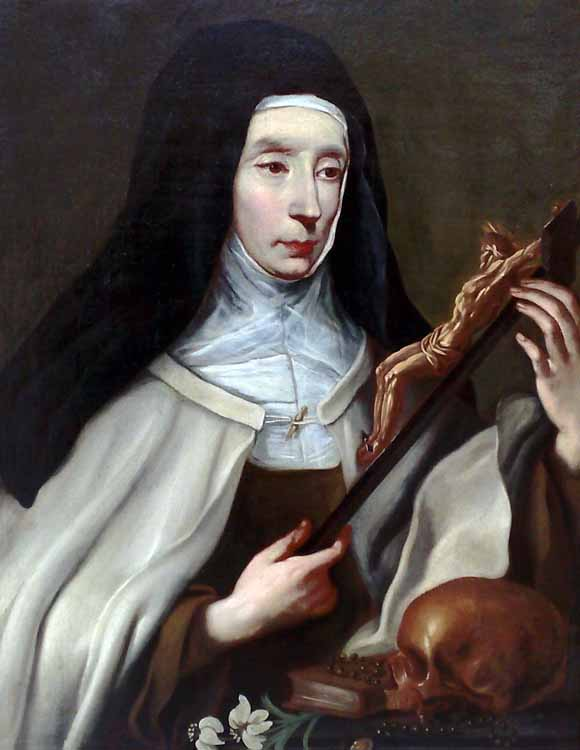

Religious
- Born: 7 January 1661; Turin, Kingdom of Sardinia
- Died: 16 December 1717 (aged 56); Turin, Kingdom of Sardinia
- Venerated in: Roman Catholic Church
- Beatified: 14 May 1865, Saint Peter's Basilica, Papal States by Pope Pius IX
- Feast: 16 December
- Attributes: Carmelite habit; Crucifix; White flower

Marianna Fontanella, OCD (7 January 1661 – 16 December 1717), also known as Maria degli Angeli or Mary of the Angels, was an Italian Catholic member of the Discalced Carmelites. Fontanella studied with the Cistercians as a child and entered the Discalced Carmelites despite the protests of her mother and siblings. She soon became a noted abbess and prioress and in 1703 inaugurated a new convent of which she herself oversaw the establishment.

Her beatification cause commenced under Pope Innocent XIII in 1722 and she was titled as Venerable in 1778 under Pope Pius VI. She was beatified in 1865 by Pope Pius IX.

== Life ==
Marianna Fontanella was born in Turin in 1661 as the ninth of eleven children to the nobleman Giovanni Fontanella, Count of Santena, and his wife, Maria Tana. On the maternal side she was related to Mara Tana who was the mother of Aloysius Gonzaga and also had ties to the Della Rovere family. In 1667 she schemed with a little brother to imitate the saints and to run off to live "in the desert", but at the time it was meant to happen the two slept in and it spoiled their plans.

Due to her family relationship, she adopted Aloysius Gonzaga as a model for personal holiness and made an effort to imitate his example.

In 1673 she became a student of the Cistercians in Saluzzo but the death of her father in 1675 prompted her to cut her education short so that she could return home to Turin where she was until 1677 supporting her mother and siblings. It was in 1677 that she announced her intention to join the Discalced Carmelites despite her mother and her siblings voicing their opposition to her decision. Fontanella entered the order at their convent of Santa Cristina. Fontanella entered because she liked their charism and was fascinated with the examples of Teresa of Ávila and John of the Cross. She was at first overcome with homesickness and at first disliked their pattern of life in addition to not getting along with the novice mistress at the time.

Her reception of the habit of the order on 19 November 1675 saw her assume the religious name of "Maria degli Angeli". She made her solemn profession after the conclusion of her novitiate on 26 December 1676. She became known for unusual penitential practices which included suspending herself with rope in the form of a cross and binding her tongue in an iron ring.

Fontanella reported experiencing several visions and numerous demonic attacks and staved them off with the aid of her confessor after suffering from these demonic visions for three years. Fontanella became the novice mistress the convent she was stationed at in 1694 and at the same time was made prioress. She was noted for her ardent devotion to Saint Joseph and for her devotion to the Blessed Virgin Mary. People from all over sought her for advice and this included the likes of King Victor Amadeus II of Sardinia and his wife Anne Marie d'Orléans.

Fontanella decided to establish a Discalced Carmelite convent named in honour of Saint Joseph in Moncalieri after receiving encouragement from Sebastian Valfrè. The convent was inaugurated on 16 September 1703.

Her community was about to elect her to a fifth term as prioress but she begged God in November 1717 to let her die if it was His will due to her reluctance to continue in her position. She fell ill not long after and died on 16 December 1717.

== Beatification ==
The beatification process commenced in 1722 under Pope Innocent XIII and she was titled as a Servant of God. Her life of heroic virtue was recognized on 5 May 1778 which enabled for Pope Pius VI to confer the title of Venerable upon her.

The cause gained greater traction when Vittorio Emmanuele II requested that Pope Pius IX celebrate her beatification. The pontiff approved her beatification on 14 May 1865.

Her body lies under the altar in the Discalced Carmelite Monastery of Saint Joseph in Moncalieri.
