= Robert Lindsay (colonial official) =

Official in British India (1754–1836)

Supervisor/Superintendent of Sylhet
- In office 1778–1787
- Monarch: George III
- Governor: Warren Hastings, John Macpherson
- Preceded by: Holland
- Succeeded by: position abolished

District Collector of Sylhet
- In office 1787–1790
- Governor: Charles Cornwallis
- Preceded by: Supervisor of Sylhet
- Succeeded by: Hyndman

Personal details
- Born: Robert Lindsay; 25 January 1754 Scotland
- Died: 1836 (aged 81–82) Scotland
- Spouse: Elizabeth Dick
- Parents: James Lindsay (father); Anne Dalrymple (mother)
- Relatives: Alexander and Charles (brothers), Elizabeth Yorke (sister)

Military service
- Battles/wars: Muharram Rebellion, Revolt of Radharam, Khasi insurgency

Robert Lindsay (1754–1836) was a Scottish colonial official and businessman who served as supervisor of Sylhet in British India from 1778 until 1787, and then as district collector from 1787 until 1790. He is known to have taken part in the Muharram Rebellion.

== Biography ==
Lindsay was born on 25 January 1754 to the Earl of Balcarres, James Lindsay and Anne Dalrymple. His maternal uncle, Charles Dalrymple got him into the trading lifestyle on a Deptford ship to Cádiz. In 1772, he travelled to India on the East Indiaman Prince of Wales, reaching Calcutta in September. Here, he was made an assistant to the Accountant-General of the revenue department and also studied the Persian language. On the autumn of 1776, he went on a voyage to the city of Dacca. He also learnt the Hindustani language as the importance of Persian declined.

=== Collector of Sylhet ===
After a few years in Dacca, Lindsay set off for the Sylhet. On arriving, he was advised to pay his respects and visit the dargah of Shah Jalal as per tradition. It is said he took his shoes off before entering and donated five golden mohurs (16 Bengali rupees) as he left. He mentions during his time in Sylhet, of the custom of drying fish (shutki) and its "noxious" smell.

In Chapter 7 of his book, he mentions the 1782 Sylhet uprising in Sylhet Shahi Eidgah. During his tenure, he successfully suppressed the Revolt of Radharam in 1786. Lindsay was succeeded as Collector of Sylhet by Hyndman and shortly after by John Willes.

=== Return to Britain ===
According to Assam District Gazetteers, vol. 10, Lindsay was "largely interested in the business, and describes the sources of his wealth in most poetic terms. 'The chunam or lime rock is washed by the rapid stream. A magnificent cataract was seen rolling over the adjoining precipice, the scenery altogether was truly sublime. The mountain was composed of the purest alabaster lime, and appeared in quantity equal to the supply of the whole world'." The book later states, "Mr. Lindsay's business experienced some vicissitudes owing to the violent conduct of the Khasi chiefs, but lime no doubt contributed largely to the fortune that he was able to accumulate in Sylhet.

On his return to the United Kingdom, Lindsay purchased the large estate of Balcarres House in Scotland from his brother, Alexander Lindsay, 6th Earl of Balcarres, with the fortune that he had made in Bengal. He died in 1836.

Political offices
Preceded by Holland	Superintendent of Sylhet; 1778–1787	Succeeded by Post abolished
Preceded by New post	Collector of Sylhet; 1787–1790	Succeeded by Hyndman
