= Chup Tazia =

Muslim term for a religious procession

Chup Tazia (Bengali: চুপ তাজিয়া; Urdu: چُپ تَعِزْیَہ) or silent tazia is the name given to religious processions held mostly on the 8th of Rabi' al-awwal by Twelver Shia Muslims in Bangladesh, India, and Pakistan to commemorate the death of Imam Hasan al-Askari, the eleventh of the Twelver Shi'a Imams. The procession is usually regarded as the last procession of the mourning period that begins in the Islamic month of Muharram.

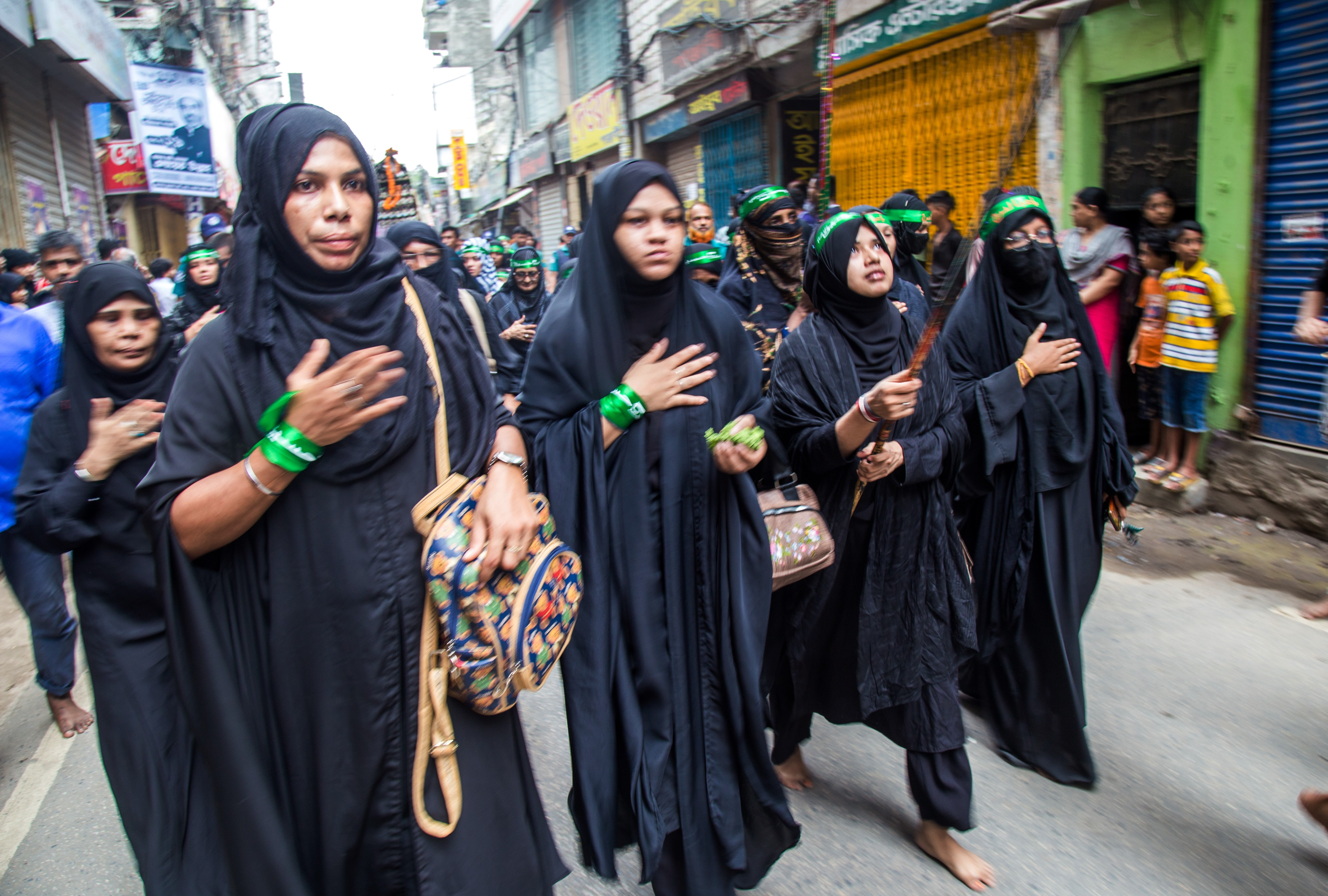
Mourning of Muharram in Dhaka

== Origin in Lucknow ==
The tradition of Chup Tazia originated in the Indian city of Lucknow before spreading to other parts of South Asia. The procession dates back to the nawabi era and was started by Nawab Ahmed Ali Khan Shaukat Yar Jung, a descendant of Bahu Begum. It is one of the most important features of Azadari in Lucknow and is currently one of the nine allowed processions. During the nineteenth century, this procession, which previously occurred on the day of Chehlum (20th Safar), was shifted to the eighteenth day of Chehlum, i.e., 8th of Rabi' al-awwal. This final mourning procession begins on the morning of 8th of Rabi' al-awwal. Featuring alam, zari, and tazia, the march originates from Imambara Nazim Saheb on Victoria Street and moves in complete silence as it passes through Patanala until it terminates at Karbala Kazmain, where the colossal black tazia is buried. On 26 May 1969, after a series of clashes and murders, another riot broke out when a Shia Alam and Chup Tazia procession, which had until that point passed through the predominantly Sunni mohallas of Pul Ghulam and Mahmoodnagar peacefully, was suddenly brick-batted from a Sunni mosque as the procession reached Mahmoodnagar.

== Allahabad ==
There are two Chup Tazia processions in Allahabad,

1. The first procession of Anjuman-e-Haideriya starts from Imambara Mirza Naqi Beg in Rani Mandi and passes through Bachchaji Ki Kothi, Kotwali, Khuldabad, and terminates at Karbala.
2. The second procession of Dasta-e-Abbasia starts from Imam Raza Masjid or Imambara Laddan Khan in Daryabad and culminates at Pathanwali Imambara Arab Ali Khan.

== Hyderabad, India ==
In Hyderabad, just before evening prayers, the procession starts from Dabeerpura Flyover and reaches Alawa-e-Sartouq Mubarak at Darushafa, a Shia-majority area. At this place, a short majlis is arranged, and after this majlis, the black flags, which symbolise sorrow, are removed and red flags are hoisted to symbolise joy. This changing of flags takes place as the next day, the ninth of Rabi al-Awwal, is a festive day known as Eid e Zehra.

== Karachi ==
Chup Tazia began in Pakistan after its independence in 1947. Mr. Nawab Hassan Lucknowi brought Chup Tazia to Karachi. After his death, his son led the procession. Now, Mr. Imtiaz Hussain leads the Chup Tazia procession in Nishtar Park, Karachi. There are two Chup Tazia processions in Karachi:

1. After Fajr, the first procession sets off from Nishtar Park in Soldier Bazar and culminates at Imambargah Hussainia Irania in Kharadar after the Zohrain prayers.
2. The second procession starts from Qasr-e-Musayyab in Rizvia Society and culminates at Masjid-o-Imambargah Shah-e-Najaf on Martin Road.

== Gujranwala (Kamoke - Alipur Chatha) ==
Chup Tazia began in Pakistan after the independence of Pakistan in 1947. In 1998, Syed Ali Abbas Naqvi started Chup Tazia juloos in Kamoke, Gujranwala, Pakistan.

Alipur Chatha (Akalghar) Chup Tazia jaloos was started in Alipur Chatha (Akalghar) District, Gujranwala (now District Wazirabad) by Dr. Syed Ali Akthar in 1948 when he migrated from Sadhaura District, Ambala (now District Yumnanagar), India. Chup Tazia majalish starts on the 6th of Rabi ul Awal follows by all day majlish on 7th and Chup Taziya procession on 8th.

The procession begins early morning from Darbar e Hussain (Dera Hakim Syed Khizar Abbas and ends at Imam Bargah Saddat.
