= Tazia =

Representation of a strine

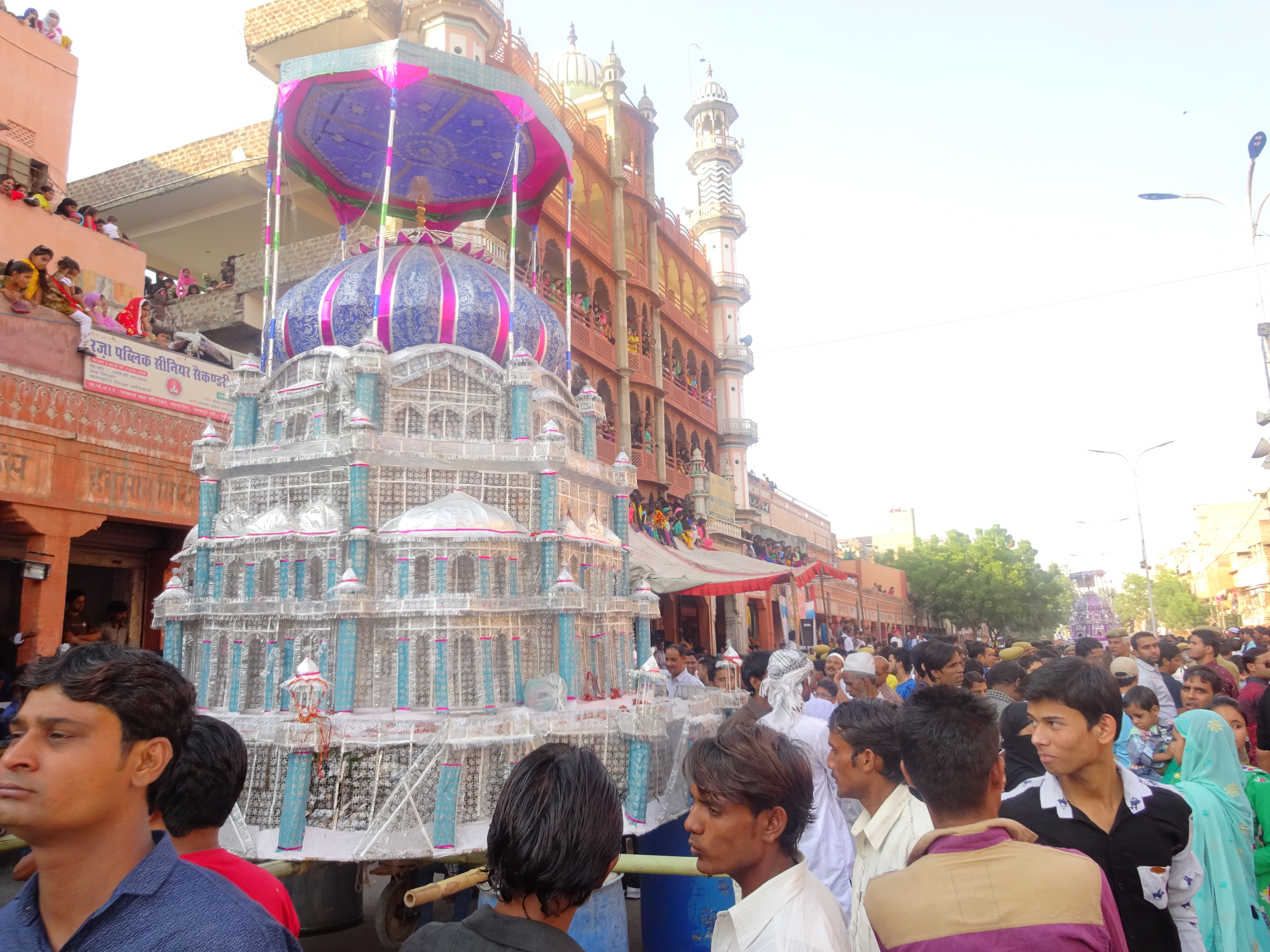
Procession of a tazia in Jaipur, Rajasthan, India

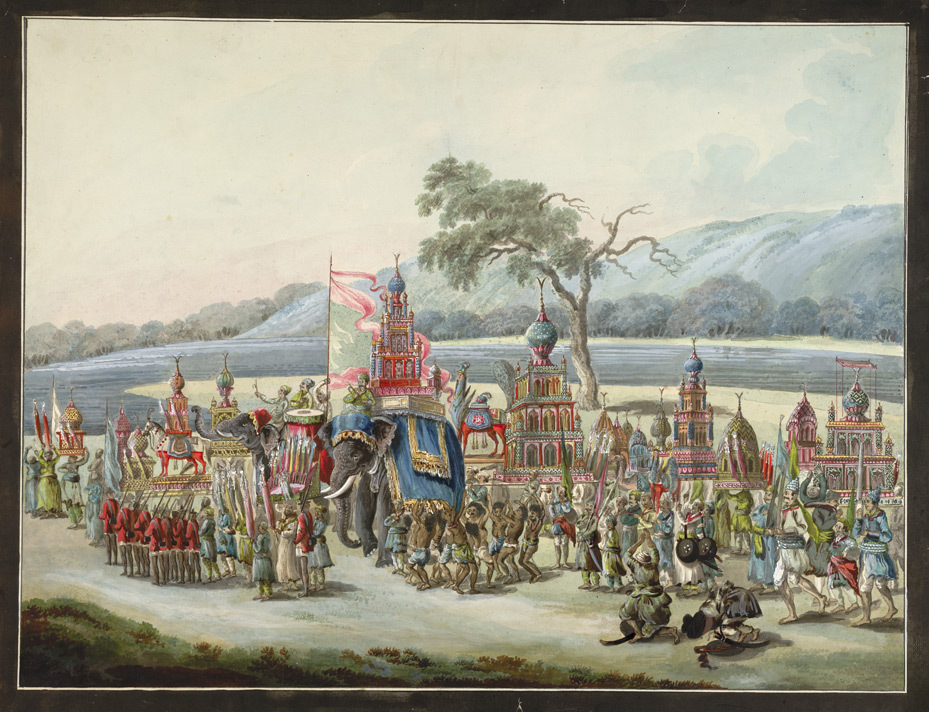
A procession of Shia Muslims carrying tazias on Ashura in the subcontinent (c. 1790–1800). The tazias were immersed into the river or ocean.

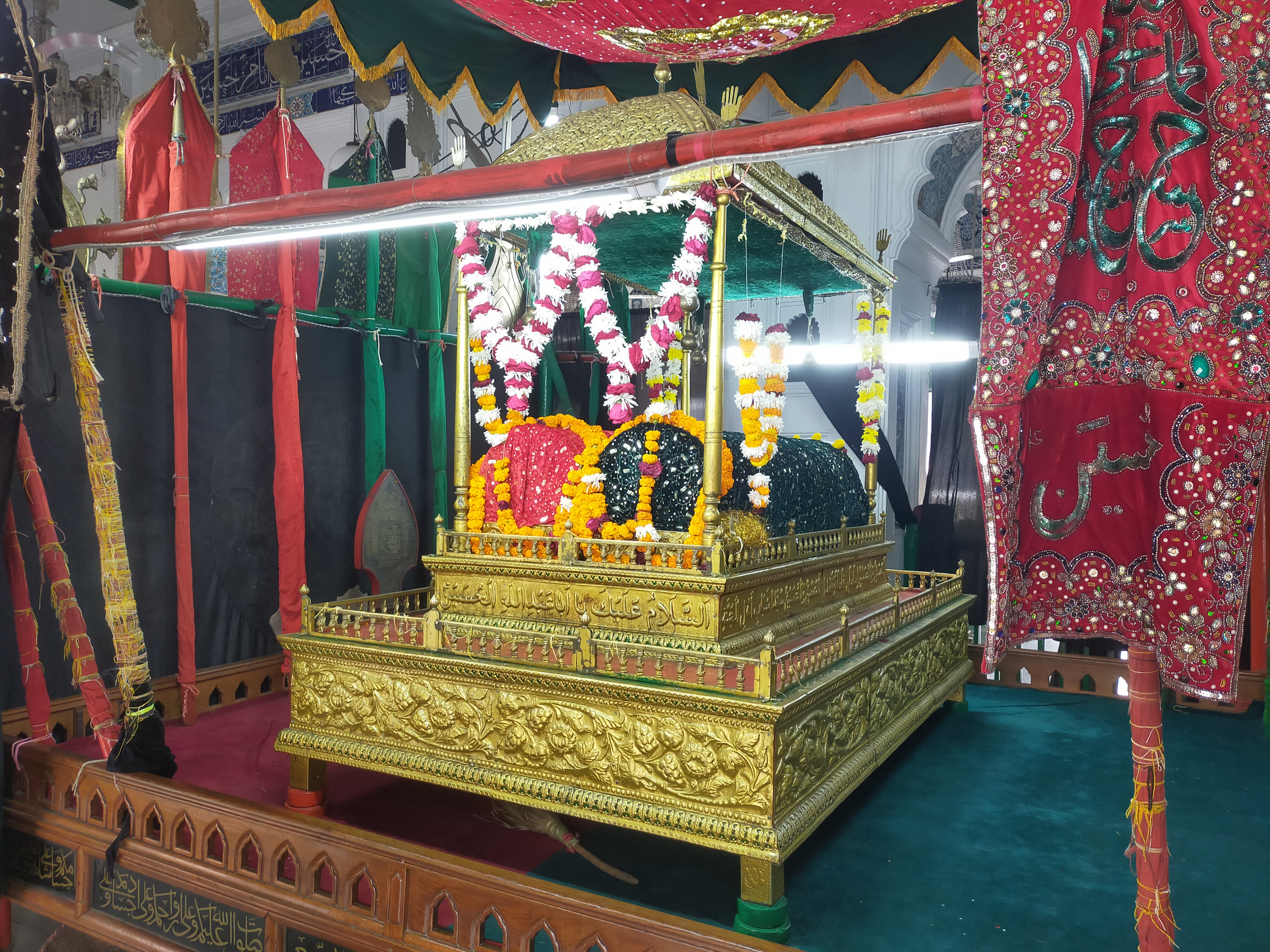
An open air tazia inside the Hussaini Dalan, Dhaka, Bangladesh. Two tabut are visible inside the poles that make the tazia.

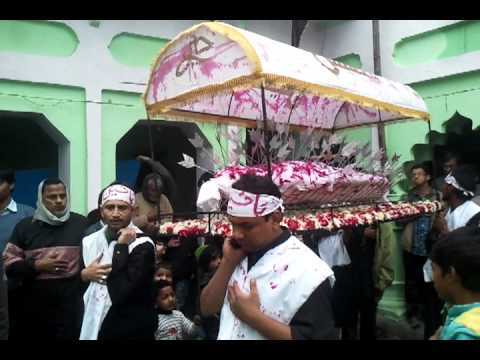
An open air tazia with a taboot for Imam Hussain inside.

A tazia (Urdu: تعزیہ, romanized: ta'ziya; from Arabic تعزية taʿziya ‘condolence’), also called tabut or taboot (Urdu: تابوت, romanized: tābūt; from Arabic تابوت tābūt ‘coffin’), is a temporary structure representing the shrine of Husayn ibn Ali, which is carried in Muharram processions in South Asia, particularly on the day of Ashura. Rather than being an exact replica, it is a creative representation of his actual shrine at Karbala, Iraq. The practice was also brought to the Caribbean as Hosay through the Indian diaspora. Tabut can also refer to objects shaped like coffins that are covered in cloth or metal, which are treated in much the same way as the miniature representations of shrines.

== Construction and procession ==
The artwork is a colorfully painted bamboo and paper mausoleum. It is then carried on a ritual procession. These tazia processions have traditionally walked through the streets of a town, with mourning, flagellation and wailing, ultimately to a local lake, river or ocean where the tazias would be immersed in the water. In some South Asian communities, a Chup Tazia (Urdu: چُپ تعزیہ, lit. 'silent tazia') procession is also observed, in which participants maintain silence.

== Geographical distribution ==
Some believe the tazia/tabut procession originated in the western region of Iran, where cypress trees are common. This is because there was a similar pre-Islamic practice of a coffin procession connected to cypress trees, such as for the ritual mourning of Siavash. Such processions are not common in other regions of Iran.

The tradition is observed by South Asian Shiites throughout present-day India, Pakistan and Bangladesh, as well as in countries with large historical South Asian diaspora communities established during the 19th century by indentured labourers to British, Dutch and French colonies. Notable regions outside of South Asia where such processions are performed include:

- British Guiana and Dutch Surinam ( now Guyana and Suriname)
- Fiji
- Trinidad and Tobago
- Jamaica

In the Caribbean, the tazias are known as tadjahs and were brought by Shia Muslims who arrived there as indentured labourers from the Indian subcontinent.

Since 1790 in Mauritius the practice is known as Ghoon Festival or Yamsé. A group of believers celebrate the 10th day of Muharram and first month of the Islamic calendar in Plaine Verte within the capital city Port Louis Mauritius.

Tabuik made from bamboo, rattan and paper is a local manifestation of the Remembrance of Muharram among the Minangkabau people in the coastal regions of West Sumatra, Indonesia, particularly in the city of Pariaman culminates with practice of throwing a tabuik into the sea has taken place every year in Pariaman on the 10th of Muharram since 1831 when it was introduced to the region by Shia Muslim sepoy troops from India who were stationed and later settled there during the British Raj.

A similar custom is/was observed in parts of Upper Egypt. Rather than being specific to Muharram, local shaykhs (saints and venerated dead) had tabut made and placed in their tombs. The spirits of such people sometimes struck people with illness to ensure one of these was constructed. This could be placed over the grave in a tomb or stand as a representative for a grave located elsewhere. Every so often, these are taken out of the tomb and carried in a procession. They are often covered in cloth as decoration.

== Intercommunal relations ==
During the colonial-era in British India, the tazia tradition was not only practiced by Shia Muslims and other Muslims but joined by Hindus. Along with occasions for Shia Muslims and Hindus to participate in the procession together, the tazia processions have also been historic occasions for communal conflicts between Sunni and Shia Muslims and between Hindu and Muslim communities since the 18th century, most notably the Muharram Rebellion which took place in Sylhet and was the first ever anti-British rebellion in the Indian subcontinent. Also in the Sylhet region, a riot took place between the Muslim and Hindu communities, even though Sylhet's Faujdar Ganar Khan tried to prevent it from forming, due to tazia procession coinciding with a Hindu chariot procession.

== Gallery ==
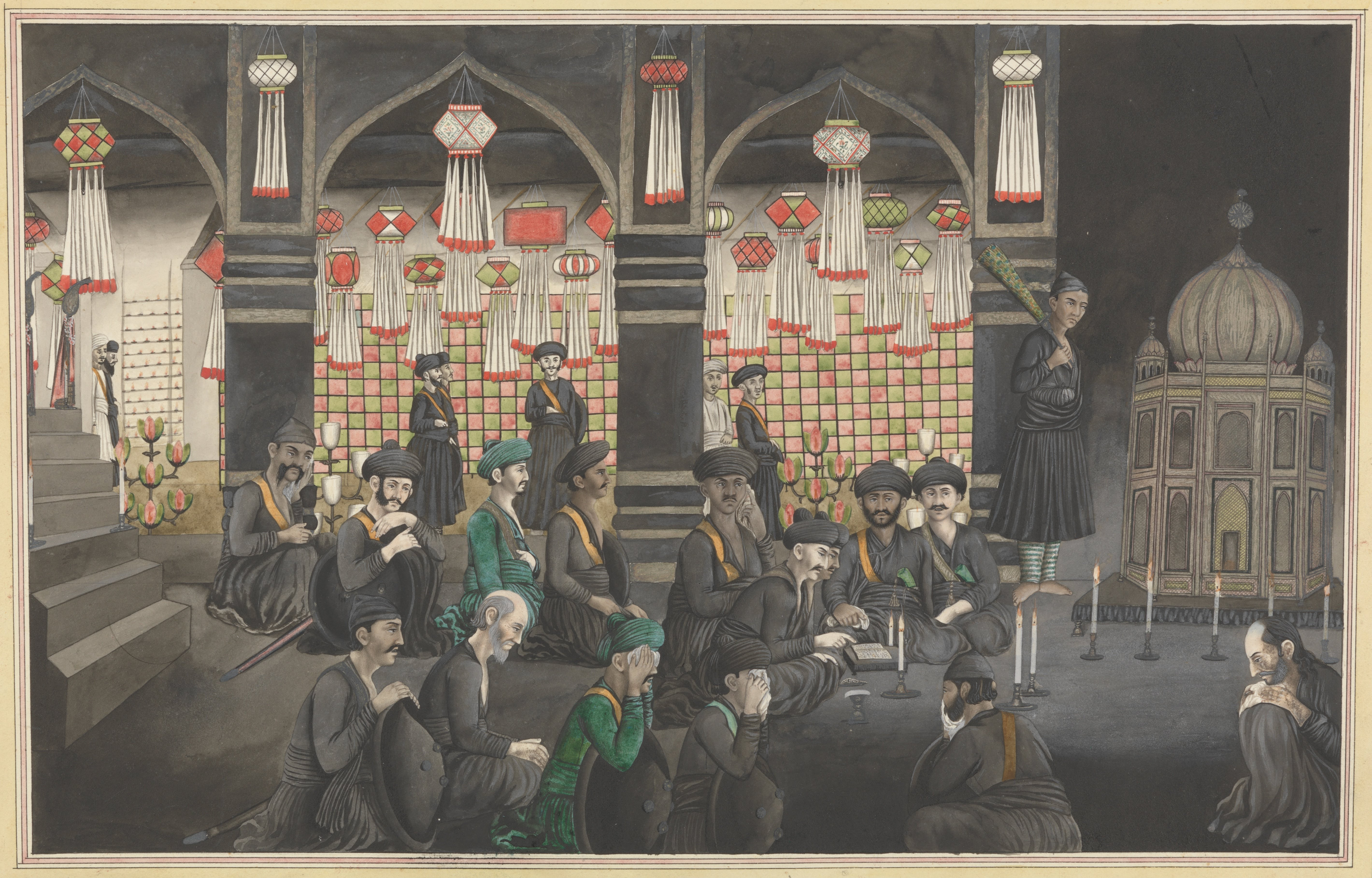
A depiction of South Asian Shia Muslims mourning before a tazia

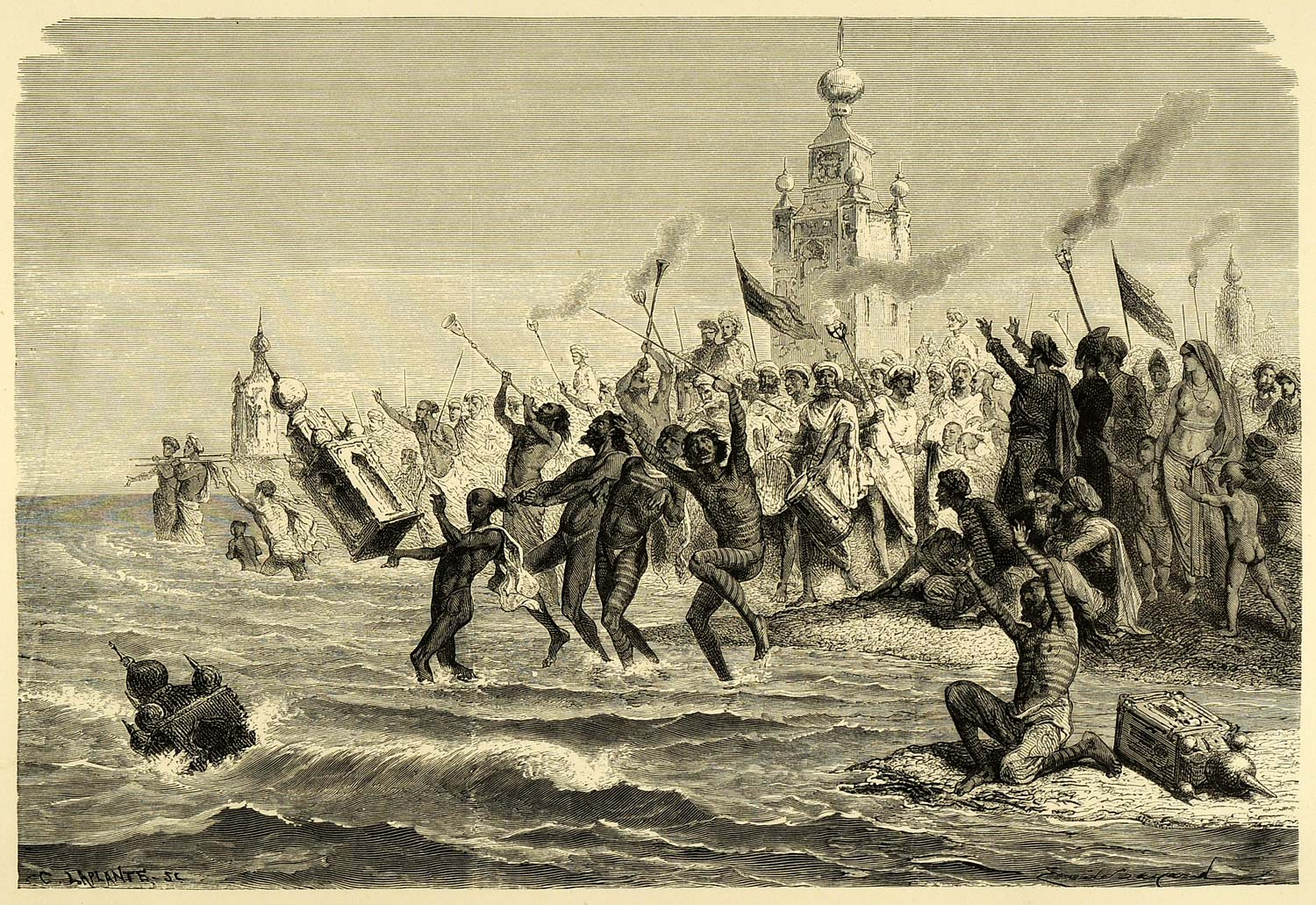
1878 painting of a tazia’s immersion in the Bay of Bengal by Shia Muslims (Emile Bayard)

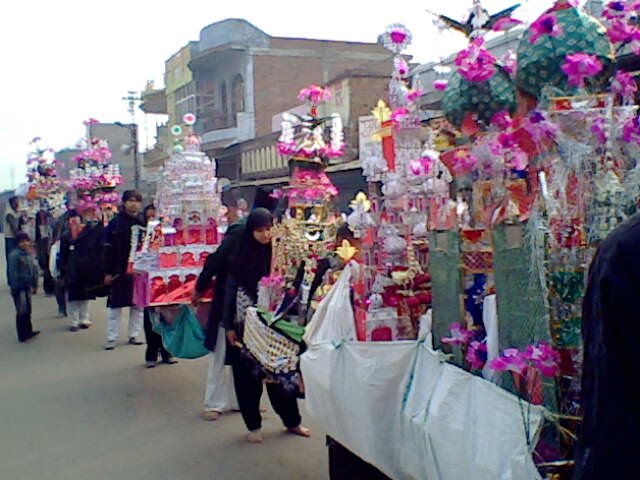
A procession of tazias in Barabanki, India

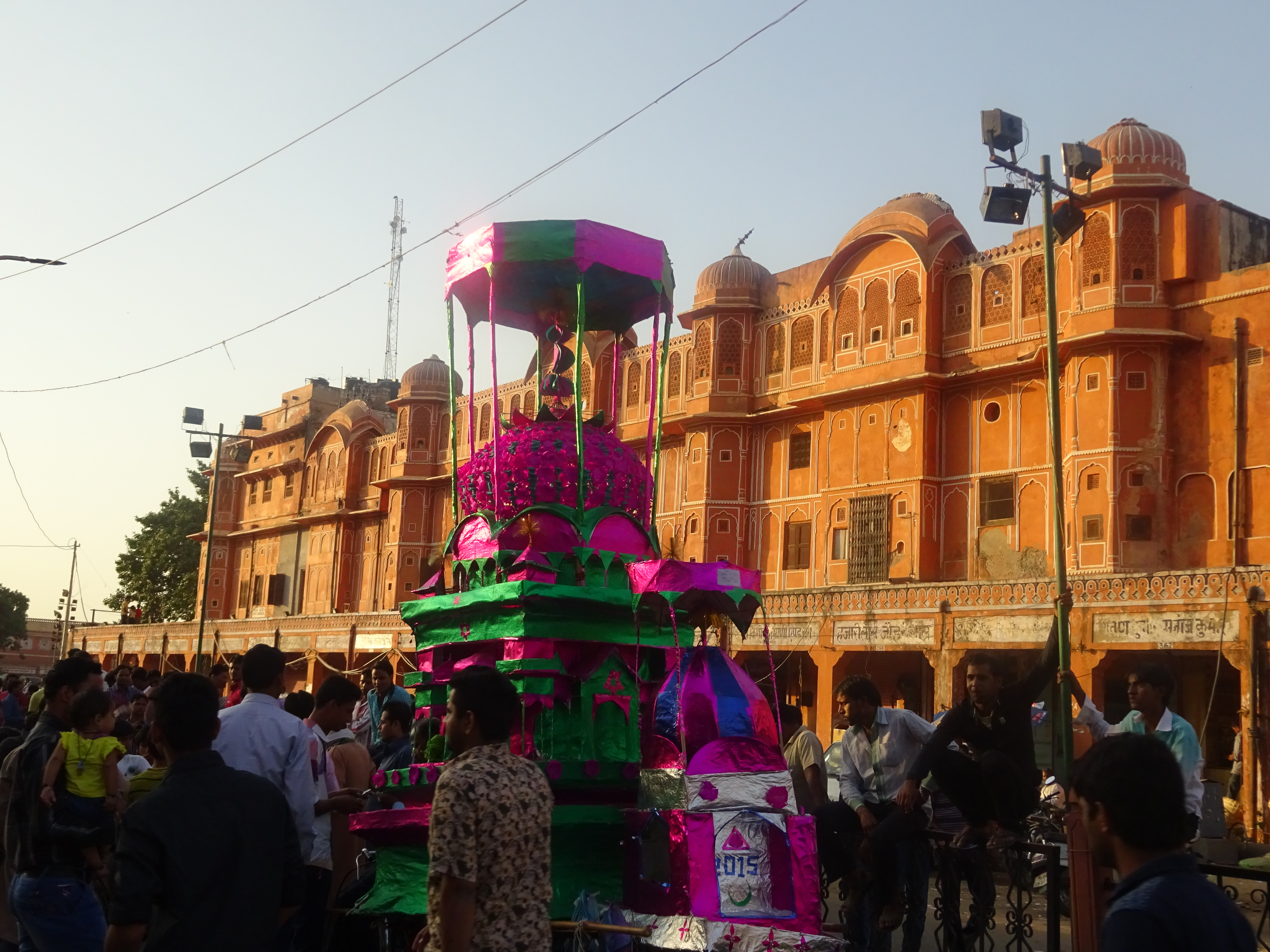
Procession of a tazia in Jaipur, India

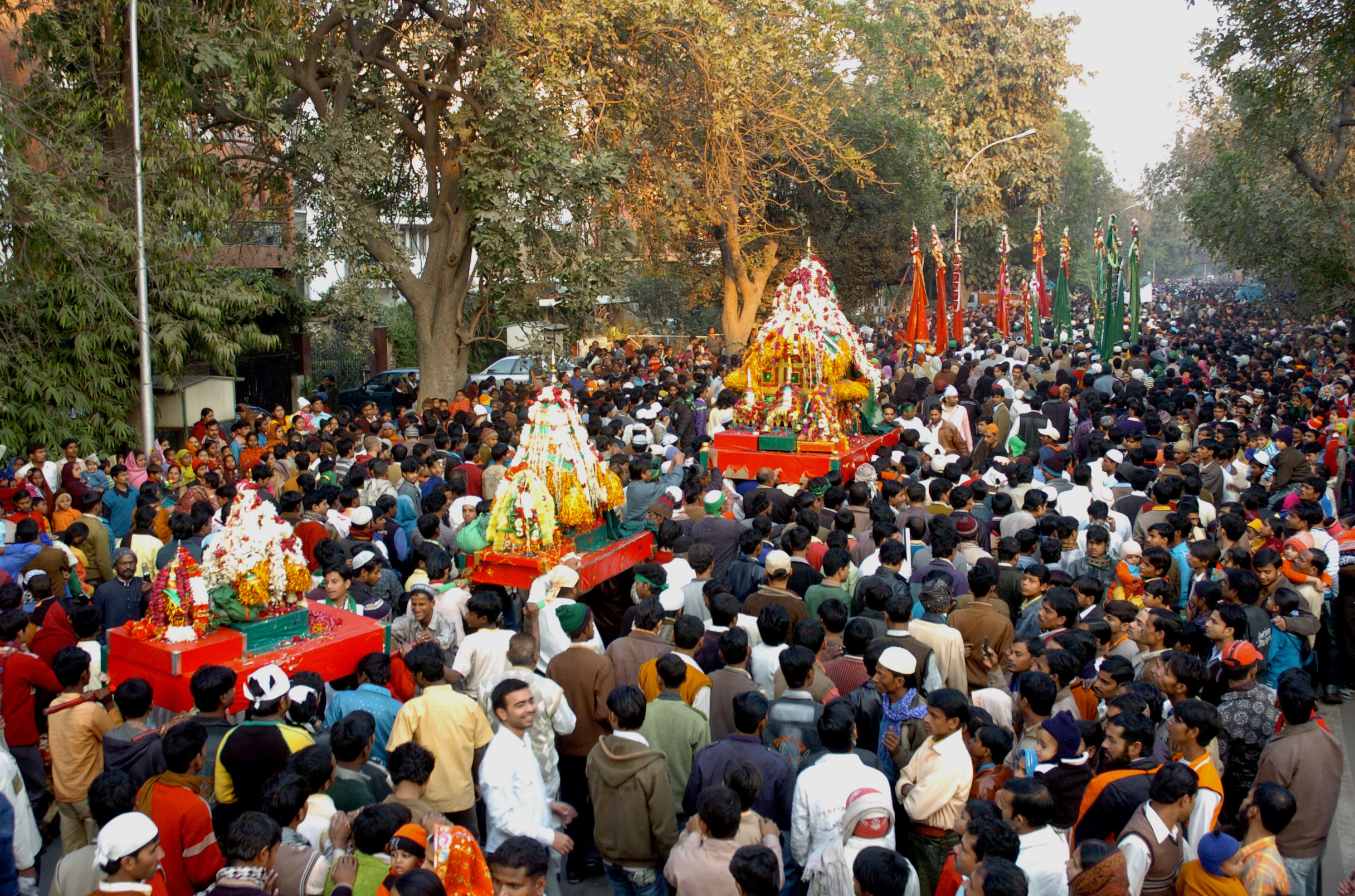
Procession of tazias in New Delhi, India

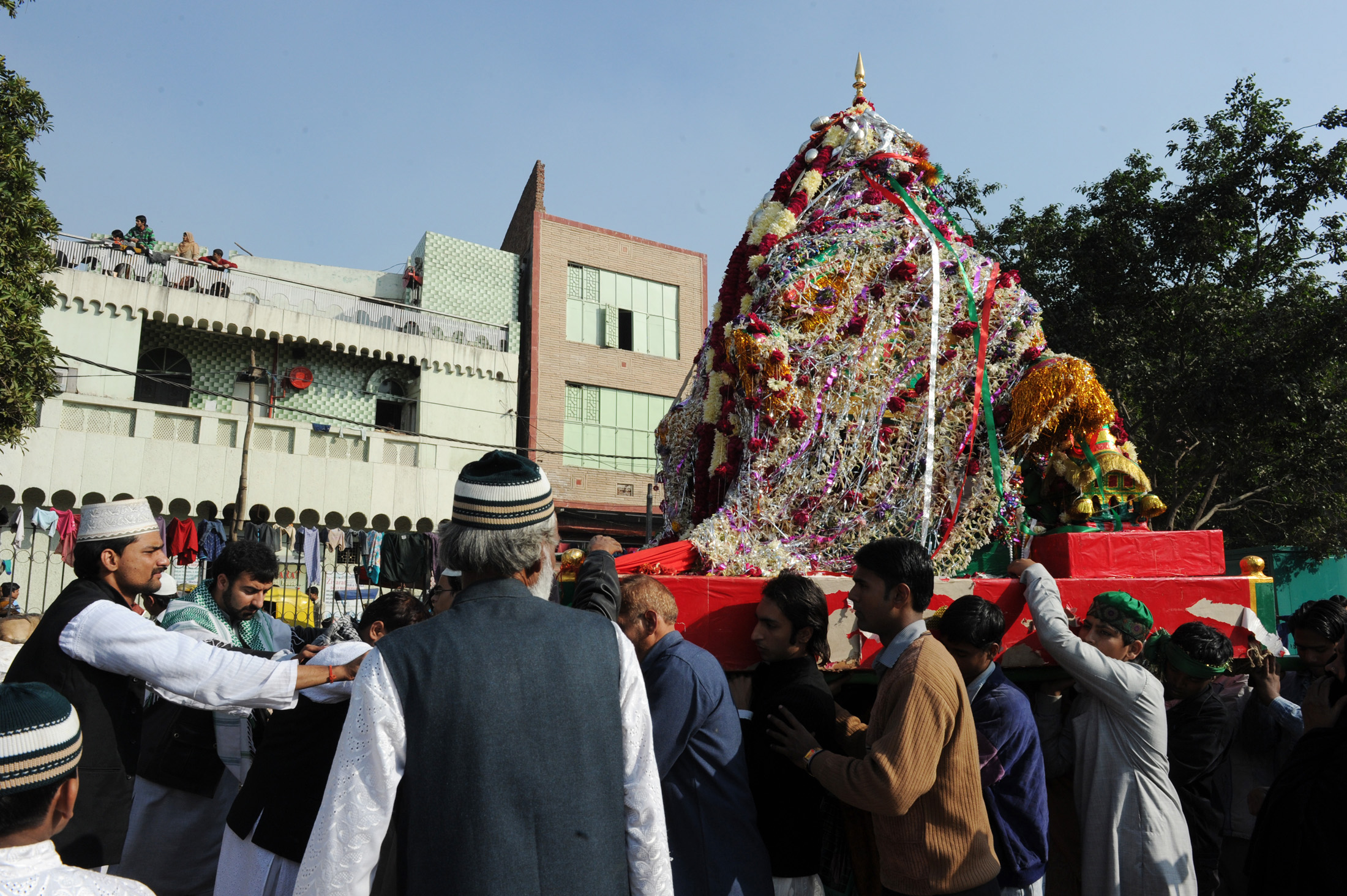
Procession of a tazia in New Delhi, India

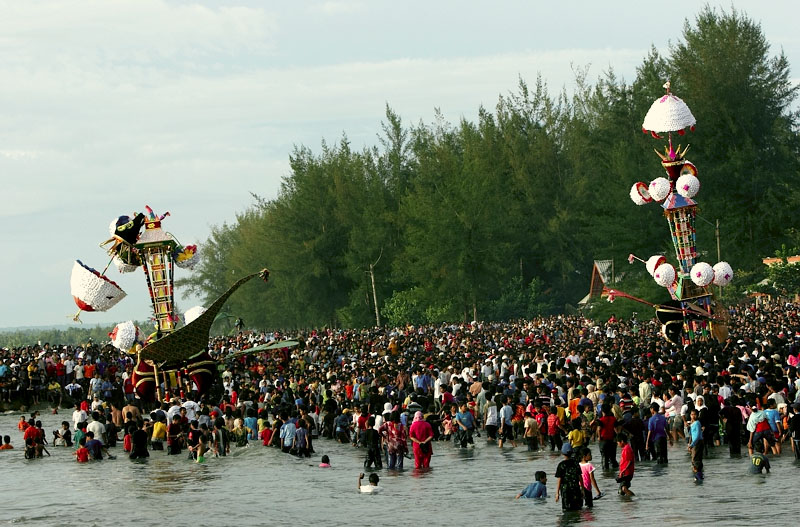
Tabuiks being lowered into the sea in Pariaman, Indonesia

== See also ==
- Chup Tazia
- Hosay
- Muharram Rebellion
- Hussaini Dalan

== Sources ==
- Chelkowski, Peter J (2005). "From the Sun-Scorched Desert of Iran to the Beaches of Trinidad: Taʿziyeh's Journey from Asia to the Caribbean". TDR. 49 (4). JSTOR 4488691.
