= Mahdi Rasouli =

Iranian Shia eulogist (born 1988)

- مهدی رسولی
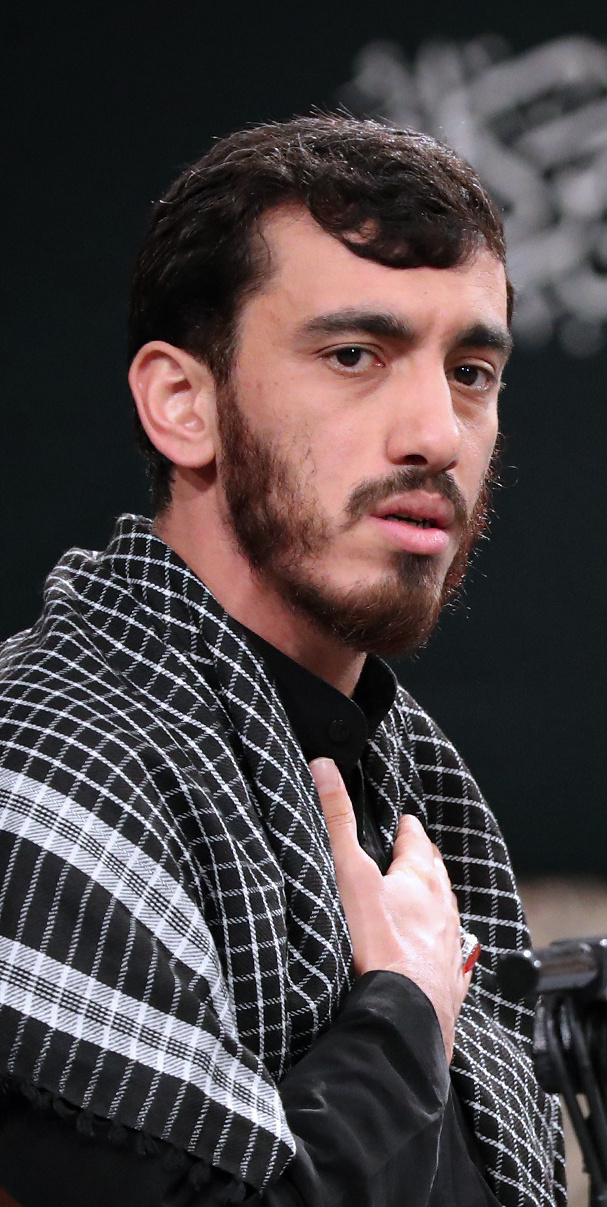
- Rasouli at the Imam Khomeini Hussainiyah, Tehran
- Born: 1988 (age 37–38); Zanjan, Iran
- Occupation: Maddah (Shia eulogist)
- Years active: c. 2010–present

Mahdi Rasouli (Persian: مهدی رسولی; born 1988), also transliterated Mehdi Rasouli, is an Iranian maddah (Shia religious eulogist) from Zanjan. Middle East Eye has described him as "the most prominent religious singer in Iran", a figure close to the country's establishment. Known for politically themed, martial rajaz-style recitations with anti-American and anti-Israeli content, he has performed in the presence of Supreme Leader Ali Khamenei, and during the June 2025 war between Iran and Israel his recitations were praised in a written commendation from a commander of the Islamic Revolutionary Guard Corps. His statements at state ceremonies have also drawn international news coverage. He performs in Persian, Arabic and Azerbaijani.

== Early life and family ==
Rasouli was born in 1988 in Zanjan, in north-western Iran. His father, Javad Rasouli, was himself a wartime eulogist and a member of the command of the 36th Ansar al-Mahdi Brigade of the Islamic Revolutionary Guard Corps during the Iran–Iraq War. He was killed in November 1990 while returning from the Baneh area of Kurdistan, when Rasouli was about two years old.

== Career ==
Rasouli leads the Tharallah (Sarallah) hey'at (religious association) of Zanjan, continuing his father's vocation. He recites in Persian, Arabic and Azerbaijani Turkish, and is described in Iranian media as one of the country's prominent Azeri-language eulogists, having led mourning ceremonies during Muharram in Iran, Iraq and Turkey, including in Istanbul and Iğdır. The British news website Middle East Eye has named him among "the most prominent religious singers in Iran", figures who are close to the establishment and are sometimes invited to Supreme Leader Ali Khamenei's Muharram ceremonies. He has recited at the Imam Khomeini Hussainiyah in Tehran, inside Khamenei's office complex.

== Political recitations ==
Rasouli is best known for politically themed recitations supporting the Iranian state and its regional policy. During the June 2025 war between Iran and Israel, his anthem "Bezan ke khoob mizani" ("Strike, for you strike well"), composed in praise of Iran's missile strikes, circulated widely and was treated by Iranian media as a cultural emblem of the conflict. The British outlet Middle East Eye counted Rasouli among the "prominent state-backed eulogists" who released wartime recitations framing the war through the symbolism of the Battle of Karbala. The commander of the Islamic Revolutionary Guard Corps Aerospace Force, Brigadier General Seyyed Majid Mousavi, subsequently sent him a written message of appreciation, describing eulogists as "soft-power officers". Another of his well-known anti-Israel pieces is the rajaz "Kheybar Kheybar ya Sahyoun".

At a Basij Day ceremony at the Imam Khomeini Hussainiyah on 26 November 2025, Rasouli recited verses aimed at the United States and Israel. According to the London-based opposition broadcaster Iran International, he declared that Iran's "one goal" was "the heart of Tel Aviv" and referred to U.S. president Donald Trump as a "yellow-haired murderer" who "will be no more"; Iran International characterised the remarks as a taunt directed at Trump.

The diaspora news outlet IranWire has described Rasouli as having "acted as the regime's official megaphone" during the confrontation with the United States and Israel, citing among his works a February 2026 chant titled "Either Death or Khamenei" that attacked Trump and the exiled Reza Pahlavi.

== See also ==
- Mohammadreza Taheri
- Mahmoud Karimi
- Saeed Haddadian
- Sadiq Ahangaran
