= Abdolreza Helali =

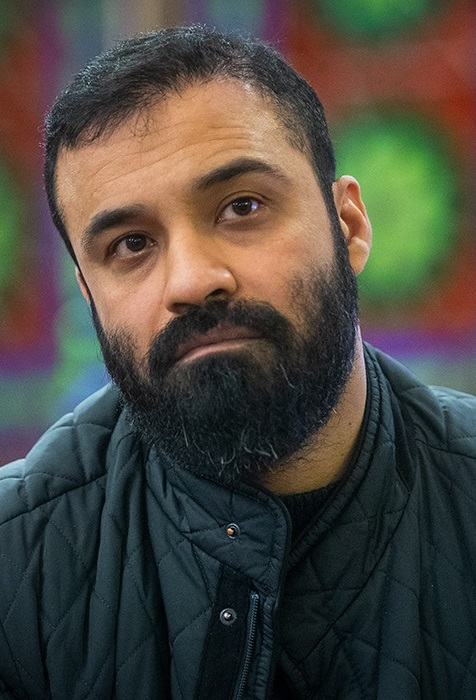
- Abdolreza Helali 2020

Background information
- Also known as: Reza Helali رضا هلالی
- Born: Abdolreza Helali عبدالرضا هلالی; 3 September 1981 (age 44); Khorramshahr
- Genres: Noha Rawda Khwani Marsiya
- Years active: 2000–present

Abdolreza Helali (Persian: عبدالرضا هلالی; born November 3, 1981) is an Iranian maddah. He is known for his innovations in maddahi, especially in the shoor style, as well as his social activities.

Helali is the founder and director of the Takiyegah Agha Morteza Ali, a cultural and social complex in Tehran that provides religious programs as well as health, nutrition, and support services for people struggling with addiction.

== Personal life ==
Abdolreza Helali (commonly known as Reza Helali) was born on November 3, 1981, in Khorramshahr and raised in Tehran.

Helali is married and has two daughters. In addition to maddahi, he also works in car brokerage.

== Career ==
Abdolreza Helali is recognized as a Shiite religious singer and a prominent figure in the art of maddahi.

He began reciting religious poetry at the age of 11. Initially, he was a student of Abbas Saberi, the founder of the “Heyat al-Reza, Gathering of Basijis and Followers of the Martyrs” in Tehran. Following Saberi's death, Helali took over the recitations for this religious gathering at the age of 14.

Helali expanded the activities of Heyat al-Reza, initially organizing gatherings at the Abu Dhar Grand Mosque and later at the Qahroudi Hosseiniyah. After several years, the group established a permanent base in the renovated Hosseiniyah of the Khomeinishahri community.

In 2022 (1401 in the Iranian calendar), Helali founded the Takiyegah Agha Morteza Ali cultural-social complex in the Harandi neighborhood of Tehran, thereby expanding the activities of Heyat al-Reza from religious to social activities.The complex provides healthcare, wellness, and nutrition services to individuals struggling with addiction in the Harandi area.

== Controversies ==
=== 2017 Iranian Presidential Election ===
During the 12th presidential election in Iran, Helali supported Mohammad Bagher Ghalibaf. After Ghalibaf's withdrawal, Helali endorsed Ebrahim Raisi. However, after Hassan Rouhani won the election, Helali joined his supporters in celebrating the victory and distributed sweets. A video of this event circulated on social media, drawing various reactions, including praise from cleric Hassan Agha Miri.

=== Arrest by the IRGC Intelligence Organization ===
In July 2017, Reza Helali, along with Rouhollah Bahmani and Mohammad Hossein Hadadian, was arrested by the Intelligence Organization of the Islamic Revolutionary Guard Corps (IRGC). The news first surfaced on a journalist’s personal page affiliated with Fars News Agency. No official body confirmed their charges, but unofficial accusations circulated online, including espionage for Israel and providing information to a female spy at the French Embassy in Tehran.

On July 30, 2017, Judiciary spokesperson Gholamhossein Mohseni Eje'i confirmed the arrest of two individuals but did not provide details. He also stated that one of the maddahs had been released on bail.

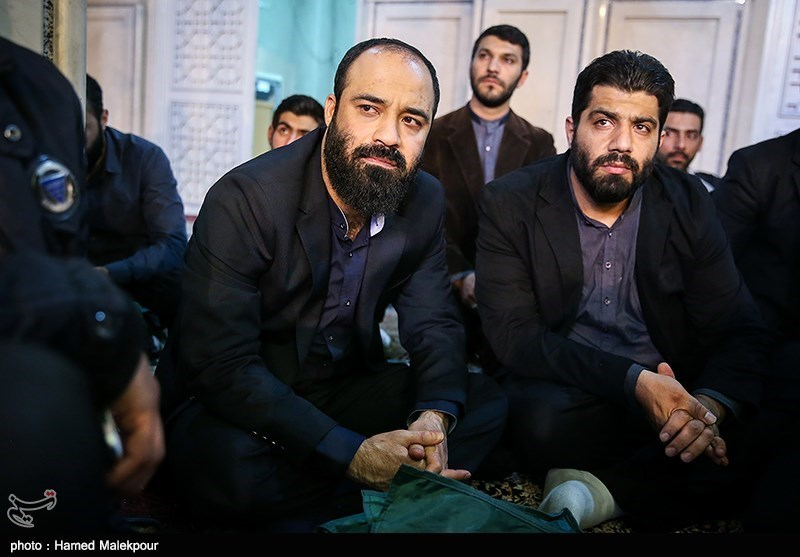
Ruhollah Bahmani and Abdolreza Helali

On September 3, 2017, Eje'i announced that the case was being handled by the Special Clergy Court and the Tehran Prosecutor’s Office. He also mentioned that the case was not security-related and claimed no knowledge of any espionage involving a woman. Since the Fatimiyya mourning period in 2019, Helali resumed public eulogies, and weekly gatherings of his Heyat have continued at the Mehdioun Hosseiniyah in Tehran.

== Works ==
- Rafigham Hossein" (My Friend Is Hossein)**, with Hamed Zamani
- "O King of Sorrow and Grief’s Shrine" – Muharram 2007
- "I Owe a World of Tears to the Mourning Ceremonies"
- "A Madman Whose State Only God Knows"
- "I Fell for Ali and Discovered Love"
- "The Moon on the Spears"
