= Hossein Taheri =

Iranian politician

- حسین طاهری
- Born: 1993 (age 32–33); Tehran, Iran
- Occupation: Maddah
- Years active: 2007–present
- Father: Mohammadreza Taheri
- Website: www.youtube.com/@hoseintaheri

Hossein Taheri is an Iranian maddah. The son of maddah Mohammadreza Taheri, he has performed at the office of the Supreme Leader of Iran and made several public political statements during 2026 that drew media attention.

== Background ==
Taheri was born in Tehran in 1993, the second son of Mohammadreza Taheri. He began reciting noha in school as a child, performing in his father's style. His father initially opposed a professional debut, granting permission only in Muharram 1389 (2010).

== Career ==
Taheri began performing professionally in 2007 alongside his father at Hosseinieh Imamzadeh Ali Akbar in Tehran, and also appeared at Heyat Rayeh al-Abbas with maddah Mahmoud Karimi. He has since performed regularly at Hosseinieh Fatemeh al-Zahra in Meydan-e Sepah, alongside his father.

Taheri has performed multiple times at the Beyt-e Rahbar (office of the Supreme Leader). During a 2023 gathering of Iran–Iraq War veterans and resistance activists, he recited elegies in a military uniform; the following year, at a meeting between the Supreme Leader and students, he recited Arabic poetry. His maddahi "Ettehdaak" was featured by Defa Press in a collection of resistance-themed performances mourning the assassination of Hezbollah leader Hassan Nasrallah.

== See also ==
- Maddah (religious singer)
- Mohammadreza Taheri
- Mahmoud Karimi (maddah)
