= Mohammadreza Taheri =

Iranian Maddah (born 1968)

Haj Mohammadreza Taheri حاج محمد رضا طاهری
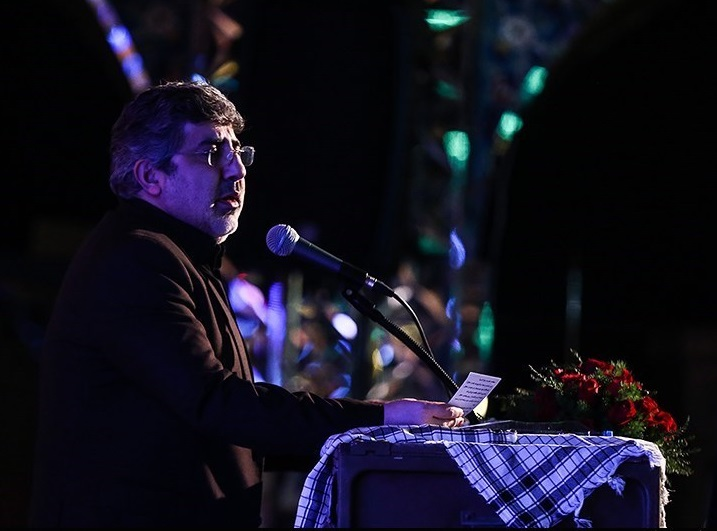
- Mahmmadreza Taheri, performing Maddahi at a memorial for martyrs of Mahalle Kan, Tehran

Background information
- Born: حاج محمد رضا طاهری; 1968 (age 57–58); Farahan
- Genre: Maddahi - Dhikr - Noha
- Occupation: Religious singer
- Years active: 1985–present
- Label: Noorieh
- Website: www.noorieh.info

Mohammadreza Taheri (pronounced as 'Tāheri', Persian: محمدرضا طاهری; born 1968 in Farahan) is an Iranian Maddah (religious singer) known for novel styles and lyrics in his maddahi performance, specially popular among Iranian youth. He normally holds his Hei'ats (public places for religious rituals/mourning) in "Hosseinie Fatemeh-al-Zahra s.a" in Tehran.

== Background and family ==
Mohammadreza Taheri is the son of late Taghi Taheri, a traditional religious singer known for Tehrani people in the past. He is married and have one daughter and two sons. One of his sons, Hossein Taheri, is also now a maddah in Tehran.

== Career ==
1980s
As a teenager, he was sent to battle fields during Iran-Iraq war, but given his age, he was serving in non-military, artistic and cultural positions there. He was a photographer and in addition to that, he started reading Noha for soldiers.

1990s
The epic of Taheri's career can be traced back to his maddahi performance at Hosseinie Panbechi during 1990s in Tehran. There he managed to attract thousands of fans, mostly young, who would follow him from one Hei'at to another one. During this time, several public figures such as footballers like Mehdi Mahdavikia attended his religious concerts in Hosseinie Panbechi.

2000s Taheri kept performing at Hei'at Maktab-al-Zahra who founded himself. In this decade he was given the opportunity to perform maddahi at Beyt Rahbari (Office of the Supreme Leader of Iran). He is still among the Maddahs who perform Maddahi at the presence of the supreme leader of Iran for Ashura and Fatemieh commemorates.

2010s - present He is still active in performing maddahi in all religious events at "Hosseinie Fatemeh-al-Zahra s.a". Even during the COVID-19 pandemic in 2020, he kept performing in his empty hosseinieh (that in a normal day without the social distancing measures, would be packed with hundreds of fervent fans), and the performance was broadcast live via online platforms for his fans.

== Political stances ==
Taheri is considered to be connected politically to the Iranian Principlists. He has openly supported Mahmoud Ahmadinejad during his presidential campaign and was part of his controversial victory march in 2009.

== See also ==
- Mahdi Rasouli
- Mahmoud Karimi
- Saeed Haddadian
- Sadiq Ahangaran
