= Matam =

Matam may refer to:

- Bramham Gari Matham, a pilgrim in India.
- Matam, Senegal, a city in Senegal
- Matam Region, a region of Senegal
- Matam, Haifa, a business park in Haifa, Israel
- Matam, Guinea, a district of the capital Conakry
- Mätam, an Arabic term for the Shia Mourning of Muharram and also for the act of self-flagellation during it
  - Hussainiya or Ma'tam and Imambargah, a Shia congregation hall used for the Mourning of Muharram
