= Maddah =

Maddah may refer to:

- Maddah (diacritic), an Arabic diacritic
- Maddah (religious singer)

== See also ==
- Maddahi
