= Shoor =

Modern form of Latmiya

Shoor Recitation (Persian: مداحی شور) is a modern form of Latmiya which originated in Iran in the 1990s and was created and popularized by Sayyid Javad Zakir. It is characterised by its relatively fast rhythm (~465ms or ~129 beats per minute), the presence of a second reciter (zaker) who recites the name "Husayn" or "Ali" repeatedly with the help of an audio mixer using the delay effect, serving as the beat (zikr), while the main reciter (maddah / radud) recites a Shoor Poem, Rajaz, and sometimes also recites zikr. The crowd also jump along with the rhythm, do different styles of chest beatings, put their hands up before the energetic part, and energise each other. In Iranian tradition, Shoor is always preceded by slower Latmiya and Rozehkhani which itself is usually preceded by a speech done by an Islamic Scholar. Shoor recitations usually take place in Husayniyyahs with speakers turned up to extremely high volumes and bright red lights symbolising mourning.

== History ==
During the 1990s, Sayyed Javad Zaker (1976–2006), a young eulogist started to attract audiences with his unique form of eulogy which had a faster speed of chest beating, energetic and musical melodies, and the introduction of a second reciter, the Zakir (ذاکر) who would along with the chest beaters, would recite the name of Husayn into the microphone with a delay (echo) effect, which would allow the holy name to continuously be repeated and serve as the beat of the eulogy. This type of recitation would become known as Shoor Recitation (مداحی شور). Sayyed Javad Zaker's Shoors were also extremely controversial due to some of their lyrics being considered blasphemous. Many scholars, like Naser Makarem Shirazi condemned his recitations as he found them to be semblable to haram music and due those aforementioned lyrics. Many other scholars condemned his recitations, which probably lead to him getting more popular and well known within Iran. By the time of his unexpected death of cancer, he had attracted many fans, demonstrated by his sizable funeral. His style was continued by many other eulogists after him, like Hamid Alimi.

== See also ==
- Hussainia
- Mourning of Muharram
- Rawda Khwani
- Latmiya
