= Shia Islam in the Netherlands =

Islam in the Netherlands

Shia form a minority within the Muslim community of the Netherlands with Twelver adherents forming a majority. Most of the Twelver or Ithnā 'Asharīs in the Netherlands are political refugees. They come from different nations, ethnic, and cultural backgrounds. They come from Iraq, Iran, Afghanistan, in addition to a small group from Pakistan and Lebanon, while the Turkish Ithnā 'Asharīs are guest workers. The majority of them came to the Netherlands in the 1990s as political refugees. The number of Twelver Shia alone who possess Dutch nationality as of 1 January 2005 was 108,728, being Iraqis, Afghanis, and Iranians excluding the figure of other Shiite sects and also of those who do not possess Dutch nationality. These groups came mainly because of political unrest in the region, such as the Iranian revolution, and the war between Iraq and Iran.

== History ==
The history of the settlement of the Twelver Shiites in the Netherlands goes back to the 1960s. A small group of Pakistani-Indian Shiites came during the 1960s, the Pakistanis as refugees, the Indians came to work (the number of Indian-Pakistani in the Netherlands at the present time is around 500 individuals, they established a Husayniyya in Amsterdam in 1976 under the name of Idāra Ja'fariyya. This place is considered the first place for worship established by Twelver Shia community in the Netherlands. This Husayniyya does not have a permanent place until the present time. The community hire a place only in the weekend from the community center in order to perform their religious and social occasions. This community has a permanent Husayniyya in The Hague under the name Mahfil-e-'Alī established in 1992.

The Turkish Shiites came to the Netherlands during the 1960s as guest workers. Their number at the present time is estimated to be 10,000 according to their Imāms. In 1982, this community established their first place for prayer in The Hague under the name Ahl-al-Bayt, which is considered as a Husayniyya. At the present time the Turkish own four Husayniyya. The majority of the political refugees come from educated urban areas, while a big number of the guest workers come from rural areas. Most of the Ithnā 'Asharī Shia came to the Netherlands in the 1990s as political refugees.

== Ethnic background ==
The number of Twelver Shia alone who possess Dutch nationality as of 1 January 2005 was 108,728: Iraqis (43,523), Afghans (36,683), and Iranians (28,522). Around half of the Iraqis are Shī'ā Ithnā 'Asharīs. The Iraqis are considered one of the biggest Shiite community in the Netherlands. The Iraqis have shown remarkable activity and capacity due to the numerous social-religious organizations which have been established by them in the Netherlands. According to the Afghan Imām Moallemzadeh, around half of the Afghans in the Netherlands are Shī'ā Ithnā 'Asharīs Muslims. The majority of the Iranians in the Netherlands are Shia Muslims as well.

== Present circumstances ==
The increased number of the Twelver Shia Muslims in the Netherlands during the 1990s and onwards has resulted in the establishment of a number of Shia Islamic national and local organizations. At the present time, some of the most essential institutions exist, such as Husayniyya, shops, periodicals, etc. While they still lack in many things, such as places of worship, suitable media, as well as to more mosques, and Islamic madrassas.

The relationship between different Twelver communities live in the Netherlands can be considered as formal, and does not go further than the cooperation at working level for the interest of the community in general. For instance, marriages between members of different Shia Ithnā 'Asharī communities is still very rare. Young generations would rather marry or get engaged to someone from its own community.

The impact of migration on some especially women takes many ways. The impact was more severe on those who came from rural backgrounds, as the Netherlands was for them the first urban society and culture they encounter. That means many of them have been isolated inside their homes, their contacts are limited within few members of their own community. For other women the religious reasons stand behind their isolation.

Their psychical state is declined, suffering a lot of nervous tensions and depression. For them every thing around them is strange, culture, language, people, norms, customs, traditions, etc. These feelings are deepened with the lack of friends, family members or even acquaintances, adding the factor of unemployment. All these factors have affected the stability of family life of some Twelver Shiite Muslims.

== Organizations ==
Shia Ithnā 'Asharī Muslims have established many organizations at local and national levels, in order to provide meeting points. Their concerns are religious, social, cultural, and political issues. They have established two religious umbrellas: al-Majlis al-Shī'ī which was officially registered on 8 September 2004 in The Hague under the name Shī'a Muslim Council and covers around 21 organizations. Different Shia organizations "Ithnā 'Asharī and 'Alawī Nuşayrī are members of al-Majlis al-Shī'ī. Al-Parlamān al-Shī'ī al-Holandī established on 13 January 2005 in Rotterdam under the name OSV (Overkoepelende Shiietische Vereniging), which covers more than 20 Shiite organizations, such as Majlis al-Jam'yīāt al-'Irāqiyya "around 15 organizations" in addition to another six organizations, some of them concern the youth such as Itihād al-Shabāb al-'Irāqī al-Holandī, and al-Lajna al-Riyādiyya al-'Irāqiyya fī Holanda. All organizations of al-Parlamān al-Shī'ī al-Holandī are Iraqis, but it welcomes other Shia Ithnā 'Asharī Muslim organizations from different regional communities in the Netherlands.

The above organizations coming together for reasons of faith in addition to sharing social-cultural needs. Their main issues are the challenge of secularism, and to set the Shia Twelver Muslim agenda, which does not differ much from the well known Muslim agenda. Their objectives are to transmit their identity to their children, and to keep their identity intact, as well as to stimulate integration in Dutch society. There are also "weekend schools" inside these organizations to teach Qur'ān and languages "Arabic, Turkish, Persian, etc." There is a number of social and cultural services organizations, such as organizing pilgrimage to Mecca, and help refugees in the Netherlands. Some other organizations are active in doing charitable project, such as orphan sponsorship in Iraq, or to help the victims of earthquakes in Iran. Almost every organization has a special committee for the youth and for women.

The Iranian community has established a number of different local organizations, such as "Iranian youth centre", which has been established by a group of Iranian youth in the Netherlands. The Iranian scientific association in the Netherlands (ISAN) was established by Iranian students of Delft University in 1989, its main objective is to promote contact between Iranian-Netherlands. Other Iranian organizations care about several activities such as; political, sport, and culture. Youth organizations have produced material in Dutch as well as in the language of the country of origin.
