= Mahmoud al-Sarkhi =

Iraqi Marja' (born 1964)

Ayatollah Sayyid Mahmoud al-Hassani al-Sarkhi
- السيد محمود الحسني الصرخي
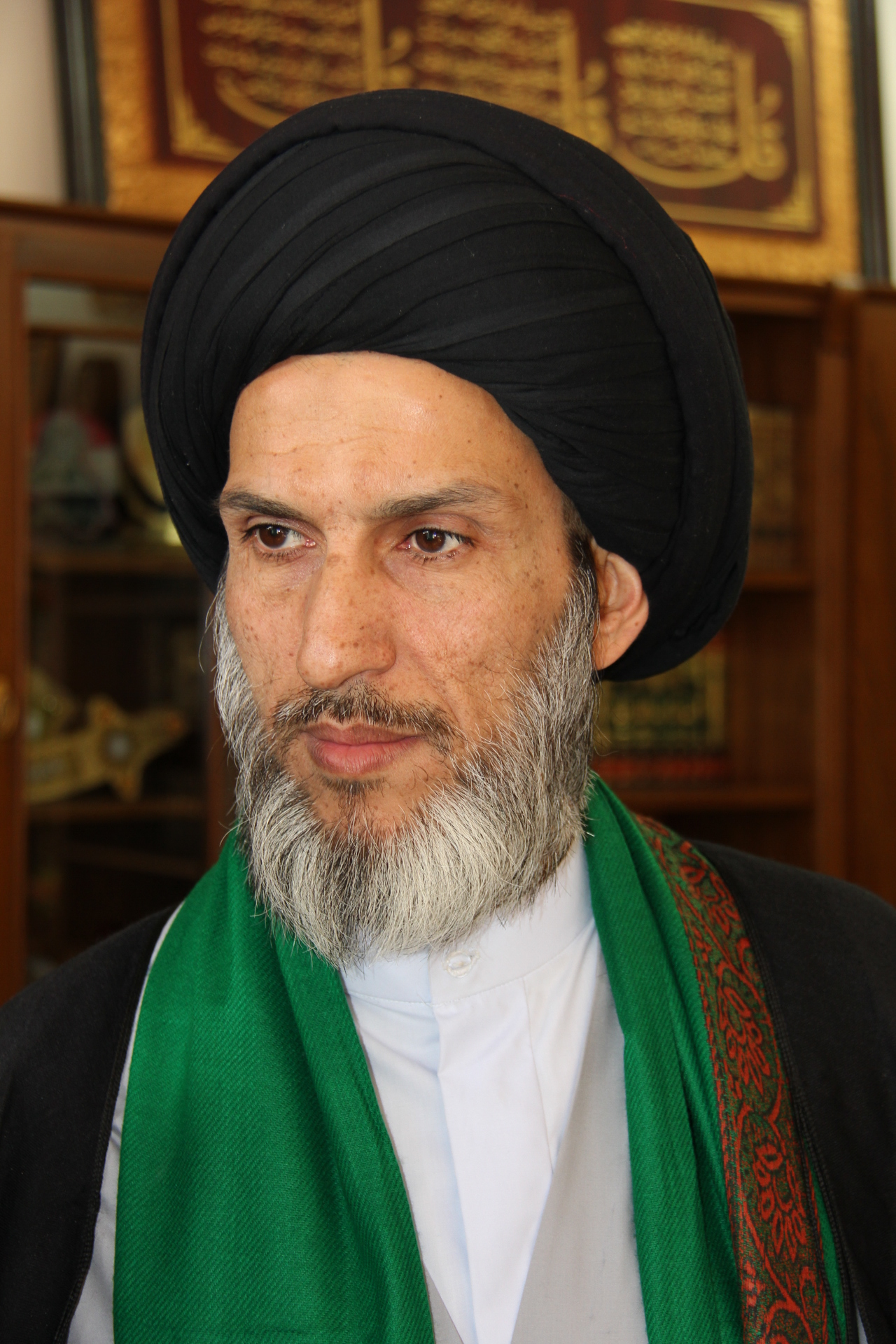

Personal life
- Born: 1964 (age 61–62) Al-Kazimiyyah, Iraq
- Education: Baghdad University
- Pen name: al-Sarkhi

Religious life
- Religion: Islam
- Denomination: Shia
- Founder of: Sarkhi Movement

Muslim leader
- Teacher: Sadiq al-Sadr
- Website: www.al-hasany.org

Sayyid Mahmoud al-Hasani al-Sarkhi (Arabic: السيد محمود الحسني الصرخي; born 1964) is a prominent Iraqi Shia Marja'. He was known for his opposition to US and Iranian interference in Iraq.

== Biography ==
Mahmood Al-Sarkhi Al-Hasani was born in Baghdad in 1964. He was raised in the confines of his father and from the very early of his age, he was fond of scientific books. He finished primary and secondary school in his hometown. He entered the college of engineering civil department University of Baghdad and he graduated in 1987. He has studied in seminaries of Najaf, Iraq under Grand Ayatollah Mohammad Sadeq al-Sadr, and later Grand Ayatollah Muhammad Baqir al-Sadr.

== Views ==
Al-Sarkhi is a very controversial figure in Iraq, his opponents accuse him of holding unorthodox or reformist views on religious matters as well as ascribing to himself higher religious credentials and position than he actually possesses. He was arrested multiple times by the police. His many opinions are critical of Shi'a Islamic beliefs such as the pre-existence of the Imams and tawassul, which has caused many of his opponents to disavow him. Unlike other Maraji, he considers tatbir, and even shoor, as well as the construction of shrines, as bid'ah.

There is also controversy over whether he or Mohammad Yaqoobi is the "most knowledgable" successor of Mohammed al-Sadr. Recently, he published a fatwa boycotting Turkish soap operas, as they contain Muslim actors and actresses, behaving in an 'unchaste, dishonorable, immoral and unprincipled' manner, while 'selling themselves as Muslims'.

== See also ==
- Abu al-Qasim al-Khoei
- The Grand Ayatollah Sayyid Ali Hussaini al-Sistani
