= Mahmoud Karimi =

Mahmoud Karimi may refer to:

- Mahmoud Karimi (maddah) (born 1968), Iranian Shia eulogist
- Mahmoud Karimi Sibaki (born 1978), Iranian footballer
- Mahmoud Karimi, Iranian singer known for his recordings of Radif
- Mahmoud Karimi, reporter for the Iranian TV program Khandevane
