= Subodh (graffiti series) =

Bangladeshi street art and graffiti series

- Artist: HOBEKI? (pseudonym)
- Year: 2017–present
- Medium: Stencil and spray paint
- Subject: Social and political symbolism
- Location: Dhaka, Bangladesh (first appearance)

Subodh is a street art and graffiti series by an anonymous Bangladeshi artist who signs their work HOBEKI?, addressing contemporary social and political themes. The first works in the series appeared in 2017 in the Agargaon, Mohakhali and Old Airport Road areas of Dhaka.

The series' central figure, "Subodh", is typically depicted as a dishevelled, barefoot young man in worn clothing. Across different murals, he has been shown carrying a caged sun, running, sitting in despair, imprisoned behind bars, embracing a child, or lying in a hammock woven from barbed wire.

== Name ==
Every mural in the series bears the tag HOBEKI?, a colloquial Bengali expression that can be translated as "will it happen?" As the artist's identity has never been disclosed, this signature has come to serve as the artist's public name in media coverage and art criticism.

The name "Subodh" refers to the series' recurring central figure, who is repeatedly addressed by that name within the accompanying text of the murals. The name is a common Bengali given name, most closely associated with the Hindu minority in Bangladesh. Over time, media coverage and public discussion have also applied the "Subodh" name to the series as a whole.

== History ==
=== Early appearances (2017) ===
Subodh graffiti first appeared in mid-2017 on walls in Dhaka's Agargaon, Mohakhali and Old Airport Road areas, showing the character running while carrying a birdcage containing a glowing sun, accompanied by short captions such as "Subodh, run away, your luck's run out" and "Subodh, run away, people have forgotten how to love." A further mural depicted Subodh behind bars, captioned "Subodh is now in jail; guilt now dwells peacefully in people's hearts", while another showed a child asking him, "Subodh, when will dawn come?"

The murals attracted immediate attention on social media, and commentators offered a range of interpretations, including that Subodh represented economically marginalised citizens, or that as a common Hindu name, the character represented the position of Bangladesh's religious minorities amid a rise in religious hardline politics. Commentators also frequently compared the anonymous artist to the British street artist Banksy, owing to the shared use of stencil techniques, anonymity, and socially and politically engaged subject matter.

=== 2019–2024: continuation and new characters ===
New Subodh murals appeared infrequently after 2019, while the artist also produced unrelated works. In April 2022, a mural appeared in the Ceramic Road area of Mirpur-12 in Dhaka depicting a woman's portrait with the message "Stop War", created in response to the Russian invasion of Ukraine; ARTCON, an agency that documents the artist's work, said the piece may have drawn on the imagery of Ukraine's "Mother Ukraine" monument. The artist has said their work aims to address the ugliest aspects of society.

In February 2022, during student protests at Shahjalal University of Science and Technology (SUST) in Sylhet over allegations against a hall provost, Subodh-related graffiti appeared on walls near the campus, including a mural showing the character speaking cheerfully on a telephone. A related, unsigned mural nearby—showing a hand reaching from darkness towards light, holding a yellow flower, also tagged "HOBEKI?"—was interpreted by students as a reference to the police crackdown on the protests. Within days, both murals were removed; the telephone mural, painted on a wall owned by a tobacco company, was erased on the instructions of the company's management.

Other recurring characters, including "Sohomot Bhai" and "Helmet Bhai", were introduced into the artist's broader body of work during this period, as murals increasingly appeared on university campuses, roadside walls and flyover pillars across Dhaka.

=== 2024 uprising and aftermath ===
Following the July uprising of 2024, street art and graffiti proliferated across Dhaka, and the Subodh series returned to prominence. On 6 August 2024, a new mural appeared near the TSC metro station at University of Dhaka, depicting Subodh wearing a crown and overturning a ruler's chair. A separate, widely discussed mural titled "This Is My Masterpiece" depicted a young woman holding the flag of Bangladesh.

In March 2025, a mural in the CRB area of Chattogram depicted a contemplative figure seated on a donkey, echoing the pose of Auguste Rodin's The Thinker. A companion piece titled "The Hand of Subodh" was unveiled on the same day at Finlay Hill, and both were described in media coverage as marking a new phase in the evolution of the series.

In December 2025, a mural appeared on a wall belonging to the Bangladesh Air Force in Agargaon, showing Subodh embracing a child, with a spray can and paintbrush hanging from his waist.

In March 2026, a second work in the artist's "Stop War" series appeared on a wall in the Old Airport area of Agargaon, depicting Subodh halting a missile with his bare hands, created in response to the Iran–Israel conflict. ARTCON founder ARK Reepon said the imagery conveyed that ordinary people have the power to stop war and destruction if they choose to. The artist's previous appearance had been on a wall in Agargaon the preceding December.

== Style ==
Nearly all murals in the Subodh series are produced using a combination of stencil and spray paint, a technique that allows the same design to be reproduced quickly using a pre-cut template.

The works generally employ a limited colour palette, most commonly black, white, red and yellow, with the caged sun frequently rendered in bright red or yellow as a recurring visual motif throughout the series. Each mural is typically accompanied by a short line of Bengali text, phrased as an instruction, warning, or question, so that image and text together construct the work's meaning.

== Interpretation ==
The artist has not publicly explained the meaning of the Subodh character, and various journalists, researchers and art critics have offered their own interpretations.

A 2018 essay in The Daily Star analysed Subodh as a symbol of the urban marginalised, of migration, displacement and social alienation, arguing that the character's continuing journey renders visible the otherwise unseen crises of city life. A 2017 essay in New Age read the character through Foucauldian theories of discipline, arguing that the phrase "Subodh, run away" is simultaneously readable as a threat, an irony, and a command.

Early commentary, including in Newslaundry and The Statesman, noted that Subodh is typically a Hindu name, and read the character as representative of Bangladesh's religious minorities amid a rise in Islamist hardline politics during the mid-2010s, as well as more broadly as a stand-in for the economically marginalised, the unemployed, and other groups facing discrimination.

In an analysis published by The Business Standard, ARTCON founder ARK Reepon described Subodh as a long-running art project in which recurring motifs of "dawn", "sun" and "light" function as chapters within an ongoing narrative.

Writing in The Daily Star in July 2026, journalist Mamunur Rashid described Subodh as embodying Bangladesh's tradition of using street art as a language of political dissent, arguing that the character's continued ambiguity—never given a clear political message or explanation by its creator—has allowed successive generations of viewers to project their own meanings onto the work. A companion piece published the same week by The Business Standard similarly described the character as a recurring emblem of "uncertainty, hope and dissent", noting that despite the crossing of an international border, the mural continued to feel both familiar and new.

An opinion piece published by bdnews24.com in July 2026 questioned whether increased media attention on new Subodh murals risked transforming the artist's deliberate ambiguity into a form of branding, contrasting the series with the work of Banksy, whose anonymity, the author argued, had allowed public discussion to remain centred on the artwork rather than on the artist's persona.

== Reception and influence ==
Since its appearance, the Subodh series has become one of the most widely discussed examples of contemporary street art in Bangladesh. The artist's anonymity, the series' continuing narrative structure, and its short but evocative captions have generated extensive discussion in social media, news media and art circles.

The character has inspired songs, poetry, photography, posters and independent artistic works. The Bangladeshi band Indalo released a song referencing "HOBEKI?", and a Facebook fan community, "Hobeki Graffiti Fans," has documented and archived new and older murals in the series.

According to UNB, the mysterious artist and the Subodh character gained recognition beyond Bangladesh's borders, particularly in the Indian state of West Bengal.

== Expansion to India ==
Early references to the Subodh character appearing in India were confined to independent graffiti works in West Bengal, which were regarded as works inspired by the series by local artists rather than confirmed to be the work of HOBEKI? themselves.

On 30 June 2026, a new mural appeared on the wall of the Majitar Nala Bridge on the Gangtok–Rangpo road in Sikkim, India, and was also published on HOBEKI?'s Instagram account. The mural depicted Subodh lying in a hammock woven from barbed wire, holding a wire cutter, with a water-filled bucket beneath him and the Teesta River flowing alongside. It was reported to be the first confirmed appearance of the artist's work outside Bangladesh.

The mural, located near a security checkpoint at the entrance to Sikkim, generated extensive coverage in both Bangladeshi and Indian media, with some outlets analysing it as a significant example of contemporary street art, and others raising questions about its presence in a sensitive border state and calling for an official investigation.

Within five days, the mural had been painted over. ARTCON confirmed the mural's removal but said no individual or authority had claimed responsibility, and no official explanation had been provided. Commenting on the removal, sociologist Manas Chowdhury said politically sensitive art often generates discomfort among sections of society, and that prominent, symbolically loaded graffiti has repeatedly disappeared in various contexts; he added that the strategic location of the Sikkim mural, and the prominence it had gained in a short time, made its disappearance feel especially significant despite most people never having had the opportunity to see it in person. ARK Reepon said that although the physical mural had been erased, the discussion it had generated continued, and that its cultural impact was likely to prove longer-lasting than its physical existence.

== See also ==
- Banksy
