= Latmiya =

Muharram ritual expressing grief

Latmiya (Arabic: لَطْمِيَّة, romanized: laṭmiyyah), Matam (Urdu: ماتم; Hindi: मातम), Sina-Zani (Persian: سینه زنی) or Sinadoydu (Azerbaijani: Sinədöydü; سینه‌دویدو) is a form of ritual mourning practiced by Shia muslims. The practice involves the rhythmic thumping or striking of the chest usually with the hand, often accompanied by participants reciting poetic elegies and chants that commemorate the martyrdom Prophet Muhammad's grandson, Husayn Ibn Ali and his companions who were killed during the Battle of Karbala. Although it is also done to commemorate other holy figures within Shia Islam.

Latmiya forms part of the wider tradition of azadari, Mourning practices commemorate Husayn ibn Ali and his comrades' deaths at the Battle of Karbala in 680 CE. The ritual serves religious, emotional, cultural, and social purposes, and in some historical and contemporary circumstances, it has taken on political significance.

== Ritual practice ==
The performance of latmiya follows a typical structured rhythmic pattern, it begins in a slow tempo where participants strike their chest in cadence with the opening lines of the noha (elegy). As the maddahs recitation increases in emotional intensity and tempo, the speed and intensity of the chest-beating increases accordingly. The collective chest-beating functions as the primary percussion and rhythmic framework for the recitation, as traditional music instruments are excluded from formal Shia gatherings. The latmiya is done collectively, within specialized Shia gathering spaces such as a Hussainiya or an Imambargha. Rituals are attended by both men and woman but in separate designated sections, while indoor gatherings are common, latmiya is also performed outdoors on significant dates such as on the day of Arbaeen. Although latmiya is most prominent during the Islamic month of Muharram, it is practiced throughout the year for events such as the martyrdoms of the twelve Imams, occurring in places of worships and even private homes. Due to the non-obligatory and fluid nature of latmiya, the practices take on different forms and qualities depending on specific context and the culture that is performing it, hence it has adapted to different sociocultural contexts.

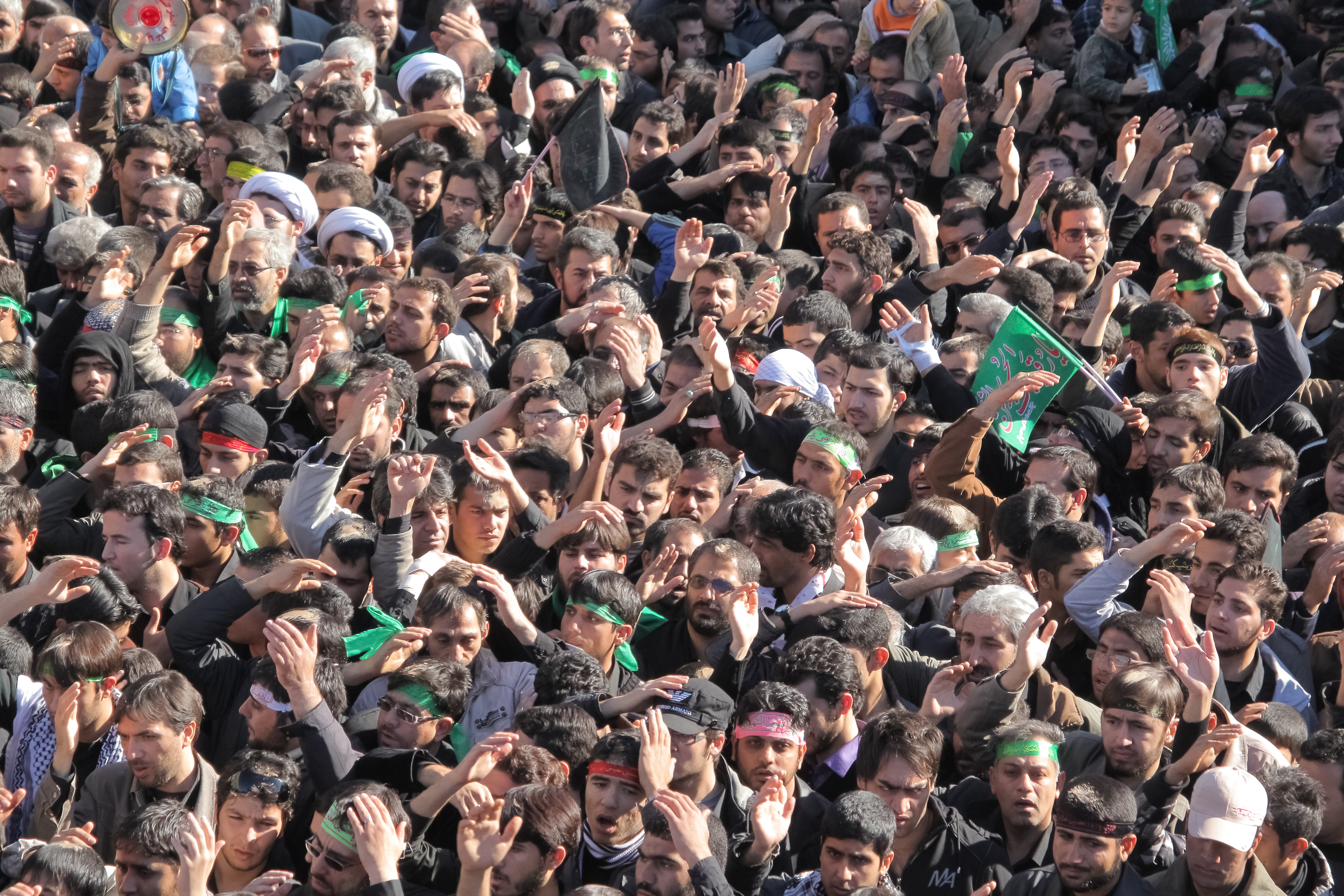
Latmiya performance in Qom, Iran

== Religious significance ==
The main theological background of latmiya is the commemoration of the Battle of Karbala, in which Imam Hussain was martyred together with 72 of his relatives and allies. For Shia Muslims, the event holds a key place in religious memory, with themes such as martyrdom, injustice, sacrifice, and resistance to oppression. During Muharram mourning assemblies, known as majalis, attendees hear sermons and stories about Husayn and the tragedy of Karbala. These sermons often begin with moral lessons and teachings that intend to instill values of generosity and self-sacrifice into the listeners, but as the lecture ends the speaker, often a sheikh or a maulana, begins to narrate tragedies of Karbala such as the beheading of Imam Hussain, hence prompting the attendees to begin weeping and beat their chests with their hands while wailing and calling out the name of Imam Hussain.

== See also ==
- Hussainia
- Karbala
- Mourning of Muharram
- Azadari in Lucknow
