= Sadiq Ahangaran =

Iranian zaker (tragedies reciter)

Haj Sadiq Ahangaran حاج صادق آهنگران
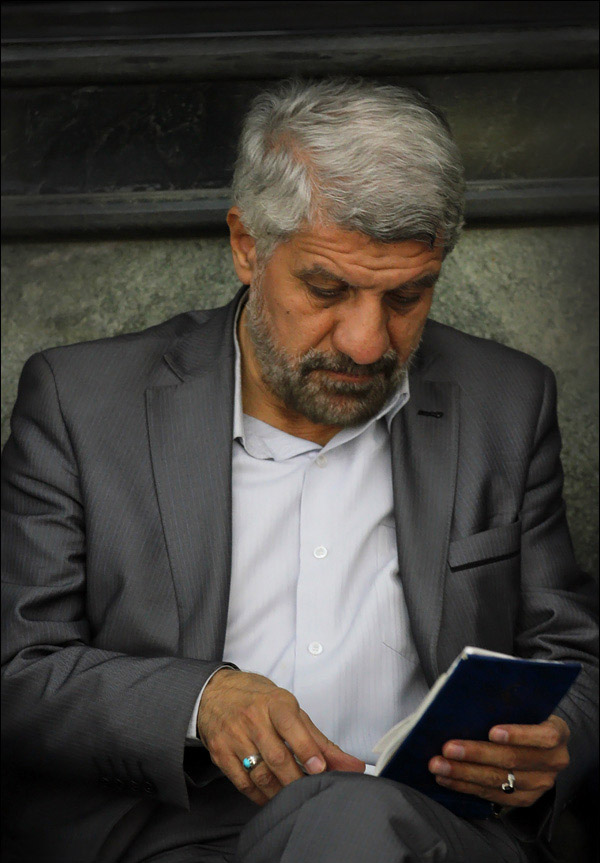
- Ahangaran in 2015 looking through a book of poems

Background information
- Also known as: Sadiq Ahangaran
- Born: Muhamad Sadiq Ahangari; 2 February 1957 (age 69); Dezful, Imperial State of Iran
- Genres: Zamine
- Years active: Eight years in the Islamic Revolutionary Guard Corps

Muhamad Sadiq Ahangaran (Persian: محمدصادق آهنگران, romanized: Muḥamad Ṣādiq Ahangāran; born 2 February 1957 A.D./1336 A.H. in Dezful), commonly known as Haj Sadiq Ahangaran or simply Ahangaran, is an Iranian zaker (Islamic singer-songwriter of dhikr), veteran of the Iran–Iraq War, and leading member of the Islamic Revolution Committee.

== Life ==
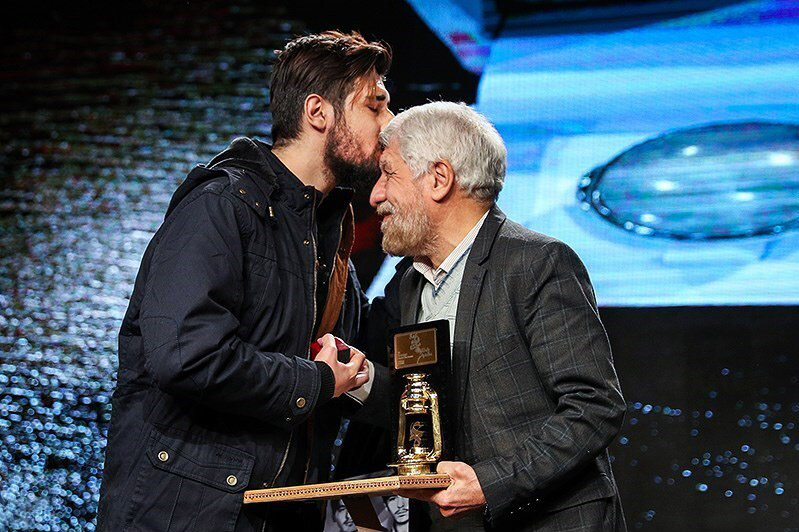
Ahangaran presenting the 9th Ammar International Popular Film Festival with Hamed Zamani

Ahangaran's complete first name is Muhamad Sadiq, his previous surname having been Ahangari. Moreover, while he was raised in Ahwaz, he is originally from the city of Dezful. Ahangaran embarked his Maddahi since his teenage period by singing (religiously/sorrowfully) in Hay'ats, which are religious foundation holding mourning ceremonies. He got married when he was at the age of 23. His offspring are included three sons and a daughter.

Sadiq Ahangaran used to recite prayer supplications (between salah), Du'a Kumayl, and also singing (religiously/sadly) in Sineh-Zani besides singing during operations of the Iran–Iraq War. His first Noha was shown live on television and was the called "Ey Shahidan Beh Khoon-Ghaltaneh Khuzestan Durood" based on a poem originally by Habibullah Moalemi. Ahangaran recited it in Jamaran with the attendance of Sayyid Ruhollah Khomeini and it ran several times on Iranian TV.

== Works ==
Among the albums of Sadiq Ahangaran are as follows:

- Daghe Azali (Eternal Bereaved)
- Dashte Karbala (The Plain of Karbala)
- Atash wa Aatash (Fire and Thirst)
- Tak Taranehha (Single Songs)

Amongst the Nohas of Sadiq Ahangaran are as follows:

- Khuzestan
- Koo Shahidan ma (Where Are Our Martyrs?)
- Ba nawaye Karavan (With the Air of the Caravan)
- Karbala Montazere Mast, bia ta Berawim (Karbala is Waiting For Us, Come to Go)
- Aman Az Del Zeynab

== See also ==
- Saeed Haddadian
- Mahmoud Karimi
- Mohammadreza Taheri
