= Saeed Haddadian =

Iranian panegyrist

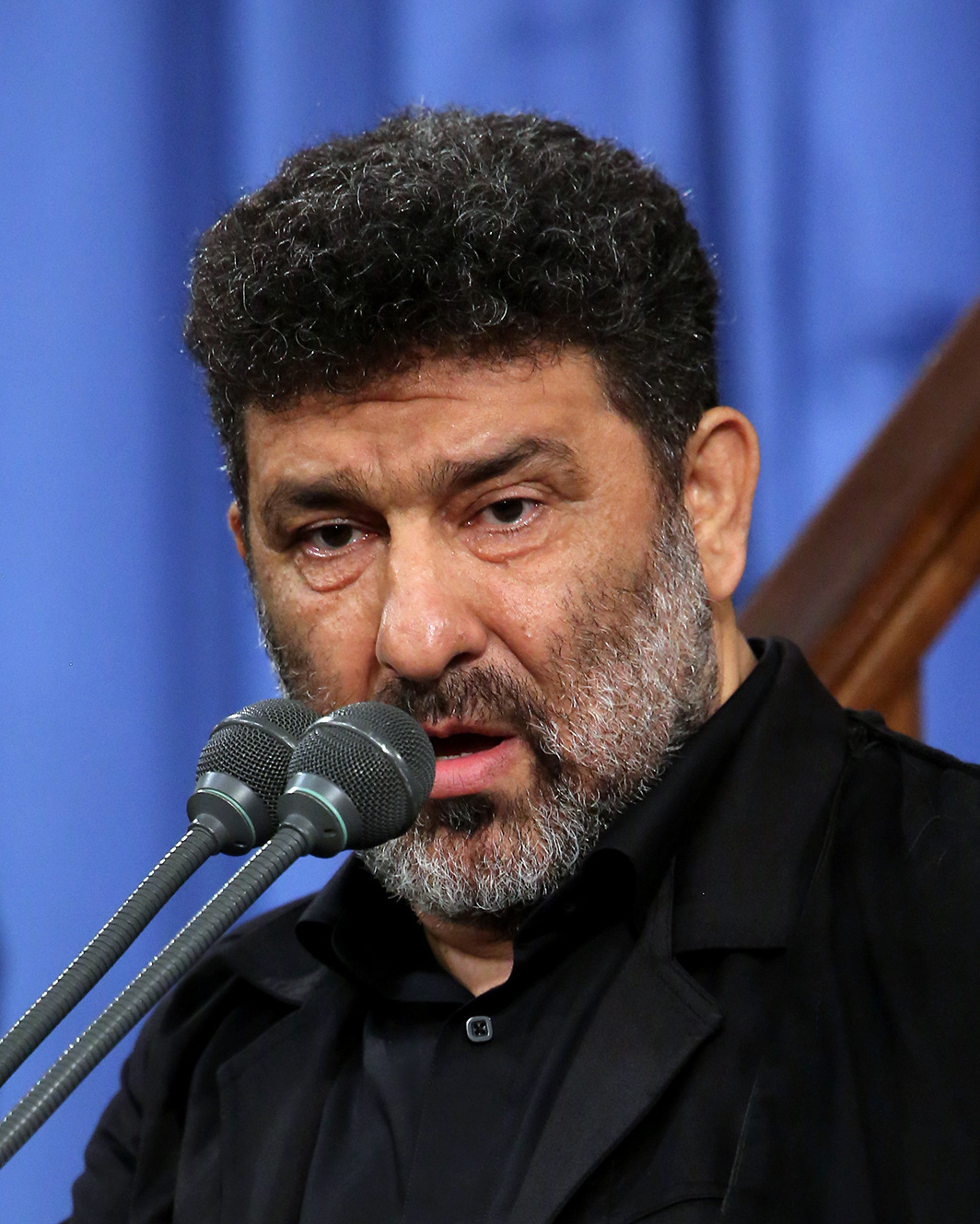

Background information
- Also known as: Haj Saeed
- Born: 7 May 1965 (age 61); Tehran, Iran
- Genres: Maddahi, zamine

Saeed Hadadian (Persian: سعید حدادیان) is an Iranian "Maddah" (Maddahi reader) who was born on 7 May 1965 in Tehran; and he is originally from the city of Nain. Saeed Hadadian is a Dhakir (Dhikr reciter) who holds Hei'ats (public places for religious rituals/mourning) in the "(great) Mahdieh of Imam-Hassan" in Tehran.

This Iranian Maddah who is not considered to be among educated Iranian Noha readers, teaches Ma'aref related lessons at "Daneshgah-Tehran" (university of Tehran). According to reports, he went to Syria (with his son) in order to defend the shrine of Sayyidah Zaynab against the assaults of ISIS.

Saeed Hadadian who is also known as "Haj Saeed Hadadian", is considered among the Maddahs who perform Maddahi at the presence of the supreme leader of Iran. In regards to his occupation, the report mentions that he was employed in 'University of Tehran' in 1997, and was the person in charge of "Qur'an section" (at that university) till the year 2000, and has been appointed as the responsible for literature office (of Guardianship of the Islamic Jurist representative) at the university.

== See also ==
- Mohammadreza Taheri
- Sadiq Ahangaran
