= Soaz (poetry) =

Elegiac poem

Soaz or soz (Persian and Urdu: سوز) is a dirge or elegiac poem written to commemorate the honor of Husain ibn Ali and his family and companions in the battle of Karbala. In its form the soaz, salam and Marsiya are similar, each consisting of a rhyming quatrain and a couplet on a different rhyme. This form found a specially congenial soil in Lucknow (a city in Northern India), chiefly because it was the center of the Shia Muslim community, which regarded it an act of piety and religious duty to eulogize and bemoan the martyrs of the battle of Karbala. The form reached its peak in the writing of Mir Babar Ali Anis. A soaz is written to commemorate the honor of the Ahl al-Bayt, Imam Hussain and the Battle of Karbala. The sub-parts of Marsiya can be called noha and soz, which mean the lamentation and the burning of the heart, respectively.

People who recite soaz are known as soazkhawan, and the act of recitation is called sozḳhwani or soz khwani.

== See also ==
- Marsiya
- Noha
- Rawda Khwani
