= Badshahi Ashurkhana =

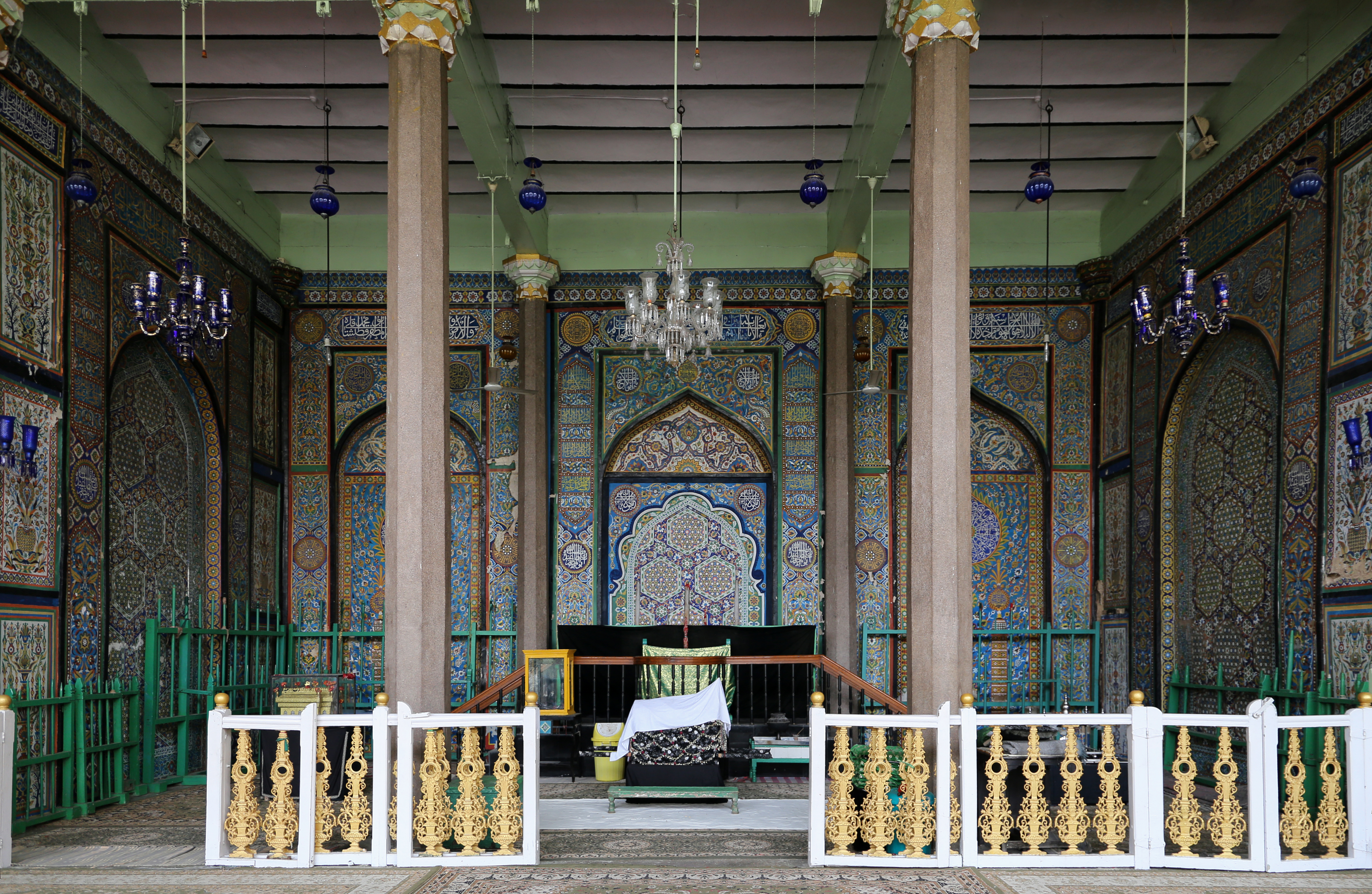

- Location within Hyderabad
- 17.369090°N 78.475726°E
- Location: Hyderabad, India

History
- Built: 1594

Site notes
- Governing body: Telangana Department of Archaeology

Badshahi Ashurkhana is an ashurkhana near Charminar in Hyderabad, India. It was constructed in memory of martyrdom of Imam Hussain, and is used during the mourning period of Moharram.

== History ==
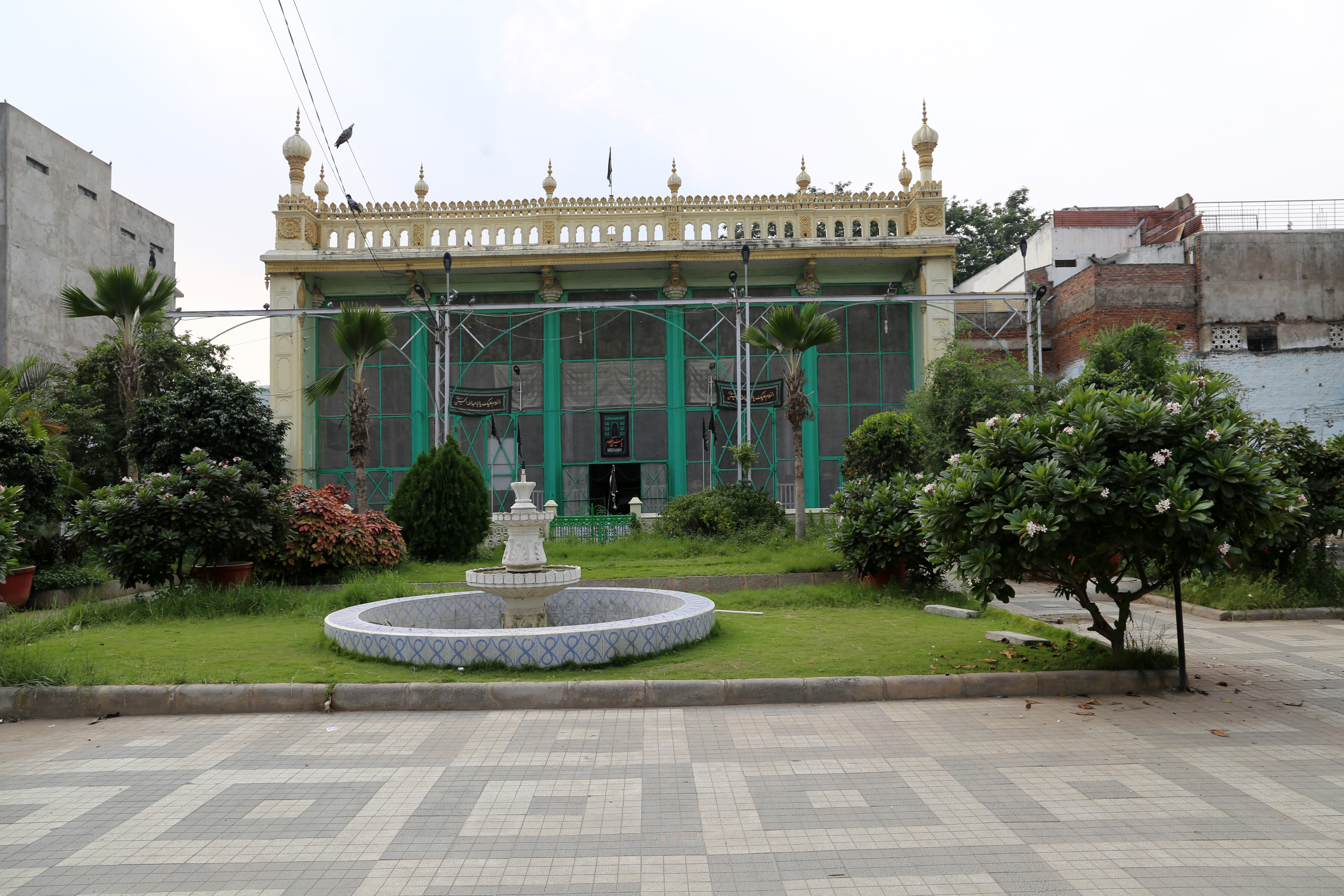
Hyderabad, Badshahi Ashurkhana

It was built by Muhammed Quli Qutb Shah in 1594. The brilliantly coloured tile-mosaic decoration was completed under Abdullah Qutb Shah in 1611.

After the Mughal conquest of Hyderabad, in a display of Sunni sectarianism, Aurangzeb used the Ashurkhana as a horse stable for the Mughal cavalry, destroying part of the building in the process. The monument was restored by Asaf Jah II in the period 1764–65; a new entry gate was added, along with outer halls and wooden colonnades.

== The Monument ==
Ashurkhana include sites like the Niyaz Khana (offering place), Naqaar Khana (drums place), Sarai Khana's (rest taking place for devotees) Abdar Khana (drinking water place), Langar Khana (food serving place), Makan-e-Mujawer (Mujawer Residence), Daftar-e-Mujawer (Mujawer office), Alawa Chabutra, and Guardroom. The Ashur Khana stands today with enamel tiles that have retained their lustre and vibrant colours even after four centuries. Hereditary Custodian:

The daily administration and religious customs of the site are looked after by its hereditary Mutawalli (Mujawer), Mir Abbas Ali Moosvi (and previously recorded in lineage texts as Mir Nawazish Ali Moosvi). The family serves as the 11th-generation ancestral custodians of the site Baadshahi Ashoorkhana Protected Monument Notified under the Ancient Monuments Preservation Act 1904
