= Hosseinieh Azam Zanjan Mosque =

Shi'ite shrine and mosque in Zanjan, Iran

- حسینیه اعظم زنجان
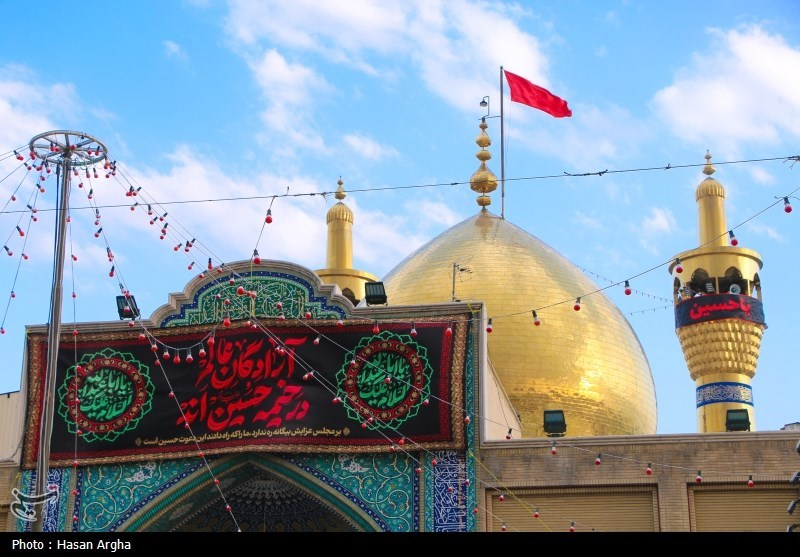
- The mosque in 2024

- Location of the complex in Iran

Religion
- Affiliation: Shia Islam
- Ecclesiastical or organisational status: Mosque; Hosseinieh
- Status: Active

Location
- Location: Zanjan, Zanjan Province
- Country: Iran
- Interactive map of Hosseinieh Azam Zanjan Mosque
- Coordinates: 36°39′52″N 48°28′35″E

Architecture
- Type: Mosque architecture
- Style: Qajar
- Completed: 1878 CE

Specifications
- Dome: One
- Minaret: Two

Website
- haz.ir

The Hosseinieh Azam Zanjan Mosque (Persian: حسینیه اعظم زنجان; Arabic: حسينية الأعظم) (Note: Also known as the Azam Hussainiya of Zanjan, the Great Hoseyniyeh of Zanjan, and the Great Hussainiya Mosque.) of is a Shi'ite mosque and hosseinieh complex, located in the city of Zanjan, in the province of Zanjan, Iran. The mosque and hosseinieh complex was completed in 1878 CE, during the Qajar era. The hosseinieh by contains the tombs of Mirza Muhammad Taqi and Haj Mirza Babai; with the eighth day of Muharram being a nominated day of mourning.

== Clique ==
On the eighth day of Muharram a clique of usually more than 500,000 people is formed and moves from the Hosseinieh Azam Zanjan Mosque and usually ends with the call to Maghrib Athan at the Imamzadeh of Ebarhim. Annually, the clique offers between 13,000 and 800 million tomans from worshippers of the Great Hoseyniyeh of Zanjan.

== Gallery ==
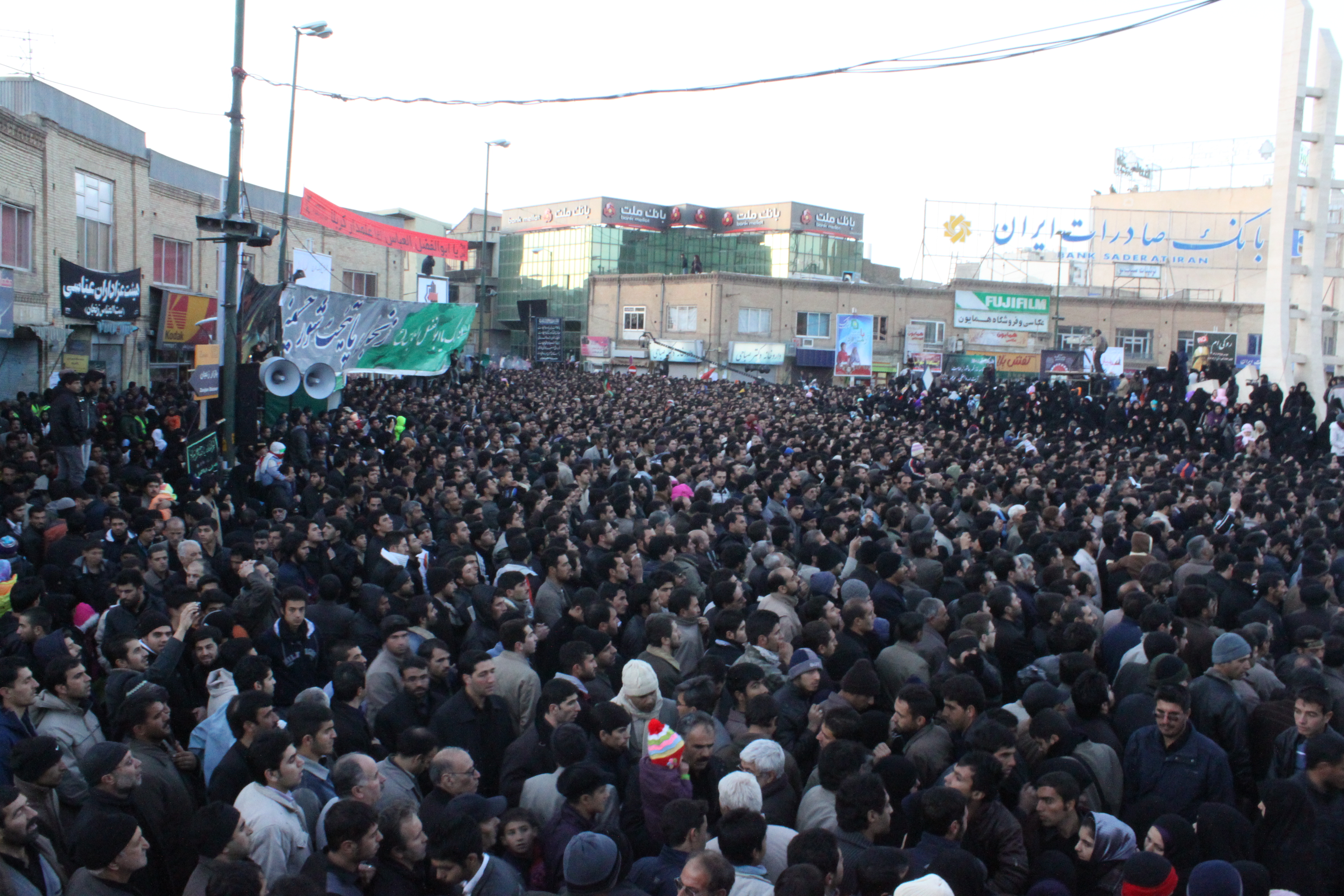
Crowd near the mosque in 2010

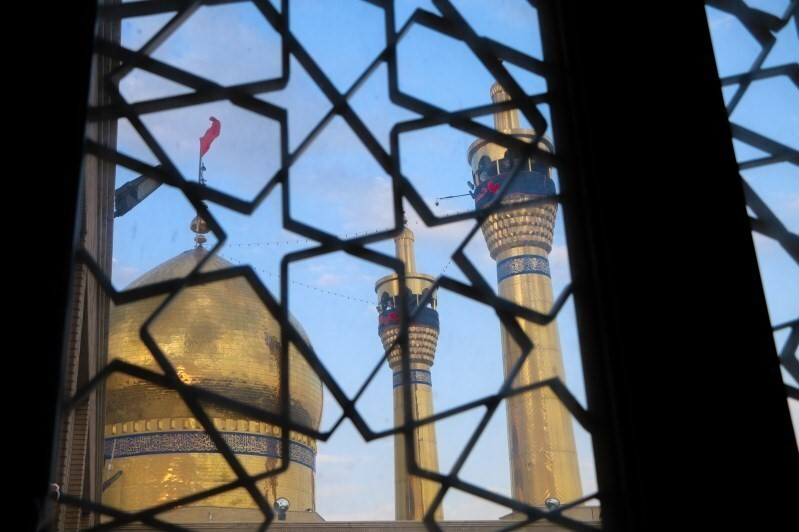
A view of the minarets

== See also ==
- List of mosques in Iran
- List of mausoleums in Iran
- Shia Islam in Iran
