= Prithimpassa Zamindar Bari =

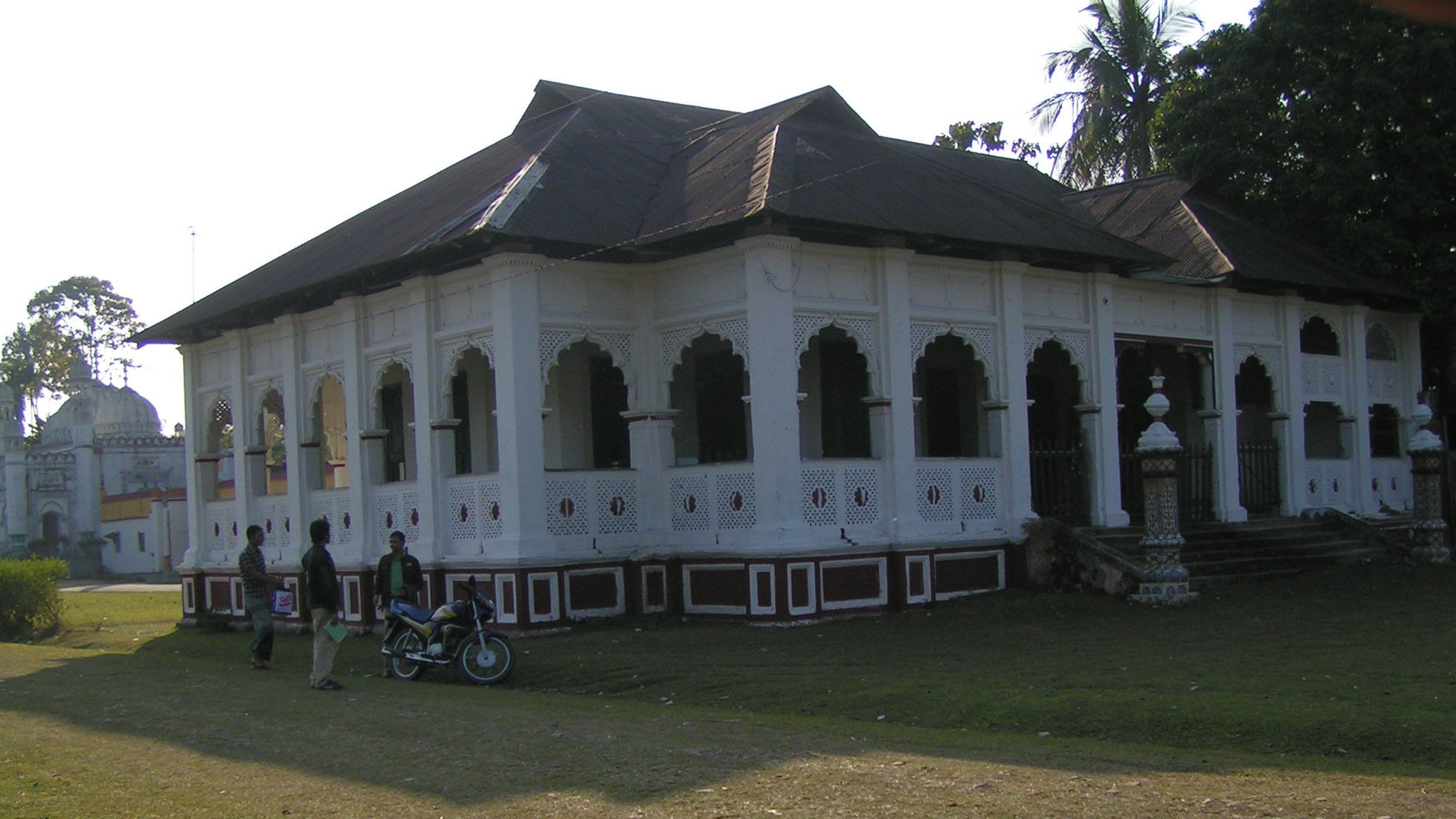
- Alternative names: Prithimpassa Nawab House

General information
- Type: Residential
- Location: Kulaura Upazila, Ward No. 3, Prithimpasha, Moulvibazar District, Bangladesh
- Opened: 18th century
- Owner: Prithimpassa Nawab Family

Technical details
- Material: Brick, surki (lime-mortar), and iron rod

Prithimpasha Jomidarbari (Bengali: পৃথিমপাশা জমিদারবাড়ি, Pṛthimpāśā Jomidārbāṛi) (also known as the Prithimpassa Nawab House) is a historic zamindari residence located in Kulaura Upazila of Moulvibazar District, in the Sylhet Division of Bangladesh.

== History ==
The Prithimpassa area was once part of the Tripura Kingdom and dominated by the Nauga Kuki tribes. In 1792, Mohammad Ali, a Qazi stationed in Sylhet, aided the British in suppressing a local Kuki rebellion. For his service, the British awarded his son, Gaus Ali Khan, a jagir of 1,200 hals (approx. 14,400 bighas of land).

During the 1857 Sepoy Revolt, rebels from Chittagong under Havildar Rojob Ali came to Sylhet seeking support from Gaus Ali Khan. While he did not assist directly, he advised them to take refuge in the hills. He was later arrested for alleged involvement but was released due to lack of evidence.

His son, Ali Ahmad Khan, significantly expanded the estate's income and influence during the British era. He is credited with helping establish the Sylhet town near Chandnighat and the Surma River. In 1872, he constructed a clock tower named after his son, Ali Amjad Khan, which is now known as Ali Amjad's Clock.

Nawab Ali Amjad Khan became one of the most prominent landlords of greater Sylhet. His philanthropic works included building staircases at Chandnighat and excavating ponds for clean water. During his time, the estate hosted dignitaries such as Tripura's Maharaja Radha Kishore Manikya Bahadur and even the Shah of Iran. To secure the Shah’s visit, General Ayub Khan was deployed by Pakistan’s central authority. Ayub Khan later declared martial law and became Pakistan’s President in 1958.

His son, Nawab Ali Haider Khan, played a significant role in the anti-colonial movement and was a prominent political figure during British India.

Later generations of the family, such as Nawab Ali Sarwar Khan and Nawab Ali Abbas Khan, also served as Members of Parliament in independent Bangladesh.

== Location and Features ==
The estate is located 47 km east of Moulvibazar town and spans approximately 25 acres. It features various old buildings, a Shia-style Imambara with ornate architecture, and a large pond with stone embankments. The aristocratic elegance of each structure reflects the wealth and status of the zamindar lineage.

== See also ==
- Ali Amjad's Clock
- Moulvibazar District
- Zamindars of Bengal
