= Mahmoud Karimi (maddah) =

Iranian Shia eulogist (born 1968)

- محمود کریمی
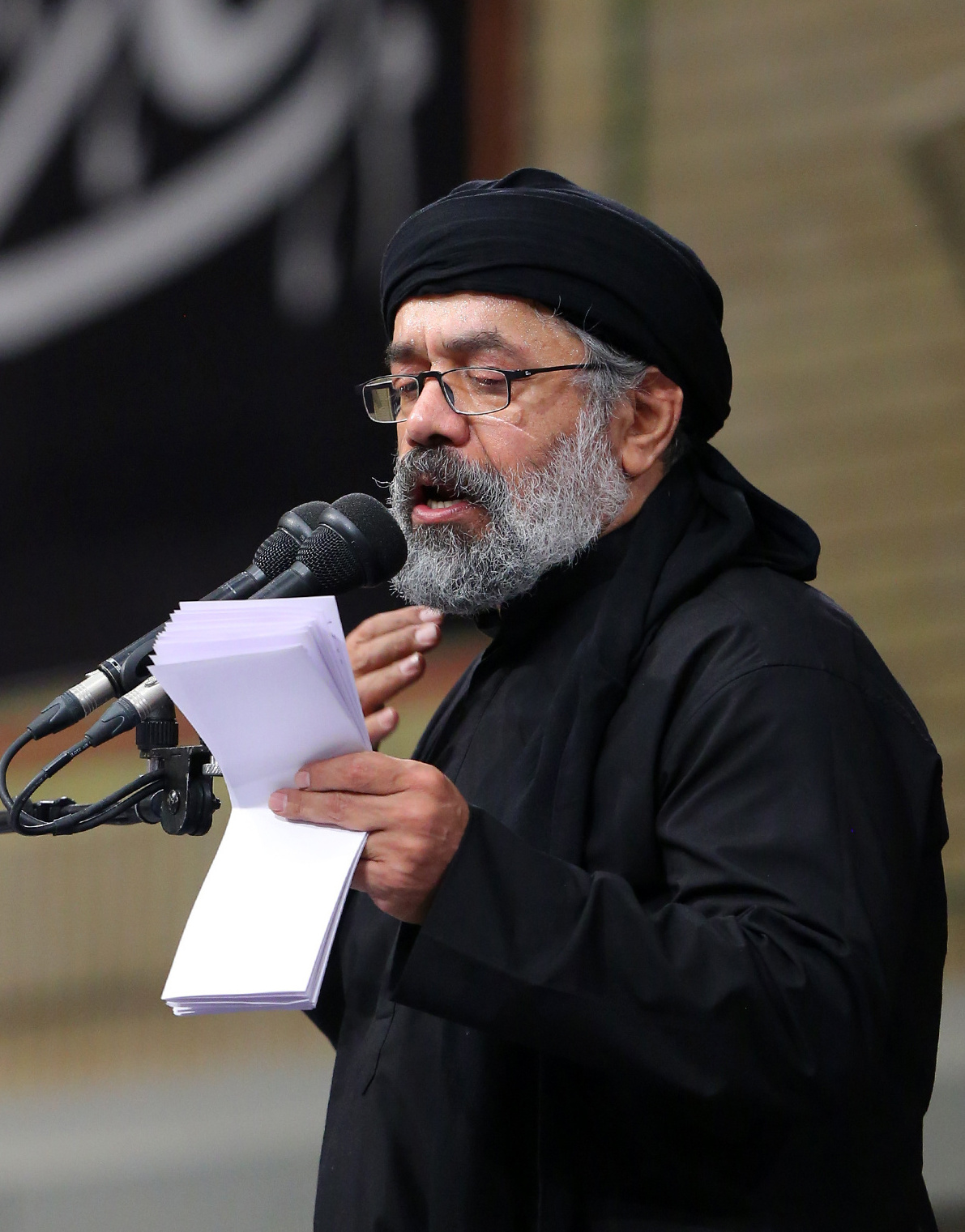
- Mahmoud Karimi
- Born: 1968 (age 57–58); Tehran, Iran
- Occupation: Maddah (Shia eulogist)
- Years active: 1975–present

Mahmoud Karimi (Persian: محمود کریمی; born 1968) is an Iranian maddah, a reciter of Shia religious elegies. Based in Tehran, he is one of the best-known eulogists in Iran; he writes much of his own verse and performs at Muharram and Fatimiyya mourning ceremonies, including ceremonies attended by the country's supreme leader, Ali Khamenei. He has also been involved in several controversies, among them a 2013 highway shooting and a 2020 televised recitation criticised as irreverent toward Husayn ibn Ali.

== Early life ==
Karimi was born in 1968 in the Nezamabad area of Tehran. By his own account he came from a religious family that was marked by the Iran–Iraq War: his father went missing in action in 1982 and a brother was killed in 1986. He has said that he started reciting noheh (elegies) at the age of seven, performing for the first time at a mosque in Shahin Shahr, near Isfahan, where the family was then living. He went on to study industrial management at Allameh Tabataba'i University but did not complete the degree.

== Career ==
Karimi leads a religious gathering (hey'at) called Rayat al-Abbas, which meets at the shrine of Imamzadeh Ali Akbar in the Chizar district of northern Tehran and was previously known as Hey'at-e Razmandegan-e Eslam. He is associated with a declamatory style that uses the sanj (cymbals) and the dammam, a large double-headed drum.

He is regarded as one of the most prominent eulogists in Iran. The London-based opposition outlet Iran International has described him as among the wealthiest, and as a favourite of Khamenei. He performs regularly at the Imam Khomeini Hussainiya in Tehran during ceremonies attended by the supreme leader. In the summer of 2025, a rendition of the patriotic song "Ey Iran" that he performed at one such ceremony—reportedly at Khamenei's request—circulated on social media; according to Iranian media, Khamenei praised the performance and asked him for another. Writing in Middle East Eye, Zahra Ladha reported that the performance took place at an Ashura commemoration shortly after the June 2025 war between Iran and Israel, and that Karimi reworked some of the verses to add religious themes, recasting Iran as the "land of Karbala".

Karimi has said that he does not earn his living from eulogising and that his income comes from a brick factory he co-owns near Buin Zahra in Qazvin Province.

== Controversies ==
=== 2013 shooting ===
In December 2013, after a late-night collision and altercation with a young couple in a Peugeot 206 on Tehran's Babaei Highway, several shots were fired from Karimi's car at the other vehicle. The bullets struck the car but caused no injuries. The couple filed a complaint but later withdrew it, the case was closed without a conviction, and Karimi's licence to carry a firearm was revoked. Accounts of who fired the shots differ: the complainants—and an early statement by Karimi describing the shooting as self-defence—were taken to indicate that he had fired, whereas the judiciary's spokesman later said the shots had come from a companion in the car. The question was never resolved in court. Writing for Tel Aviv University's Alliance Center for Iranian Studies, the analyst Raz Zimmt observed that the episode reopened a public debate in Iran over the social and political standing of maddahs.

=== 2020 televised recitation ===
In 2020, during a live broadcast on the state channel IRIB TV2, Karimi recited a folk story that many viewers understood as portraying Husayn ibn Ali in a gambling scene. The broadcast was cut off, and the recitation drew criticism, including from a member of parliament. Karimi later apologised, saying that he had perhaps not conveyed the story well.

== Political positions ==
Karimi has used his recitations and public statements to comment on Iranian politics. In 2015 he criticised President Hassan Rouhani and the parliamentary speaker Ali Larijani over the government's nuclear diplomacy with Western powers. In 2021, after the leak of a recorded interview with Foreign Minister Mohammad Javad Zarif, he recited verses widely understood as comparing Zarif to a figure regarded in Shia tradition as a traitor.
