= Rowzeh-khani =

Shia ritual to mourn Husayn ibn Ali's death

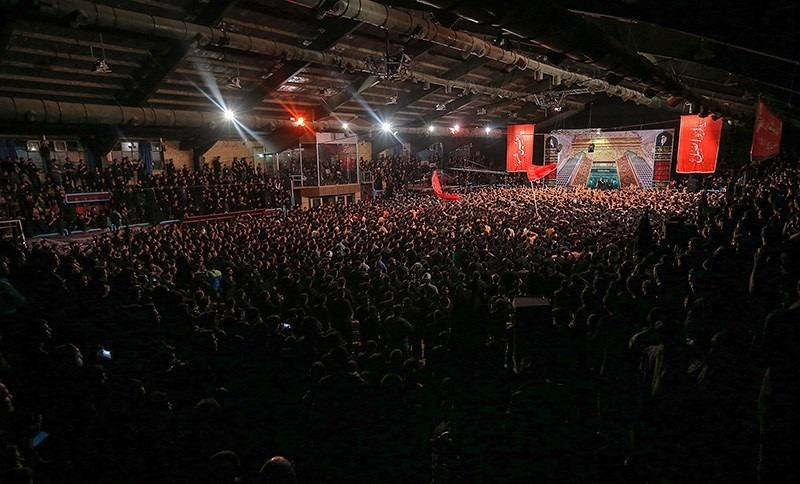
The ritual of Rowzeh-khani in Qom

Rowzeh-khani, (Note: Modern Iranian Persian: روضه‌خوانی, romanized: Rowze-xâni.) also romanized Rawza-khwani (Note: Classical Persian: روضه‌خوانی, romanized: Rawża-xwānī.) (Note: Less commonly romanized as Rawda-khwani, Rozeh-khani, Rawzeh-khani.) (lit. 'reading of the Garden [of the Martyrs]'), is the Shia Iranian Muslim ritual of the mourning of Muharram. It is held every day of the year to commemorate the death of Husayn ibn Ali and his followers during the Battle of Karbala.

== Origin ==
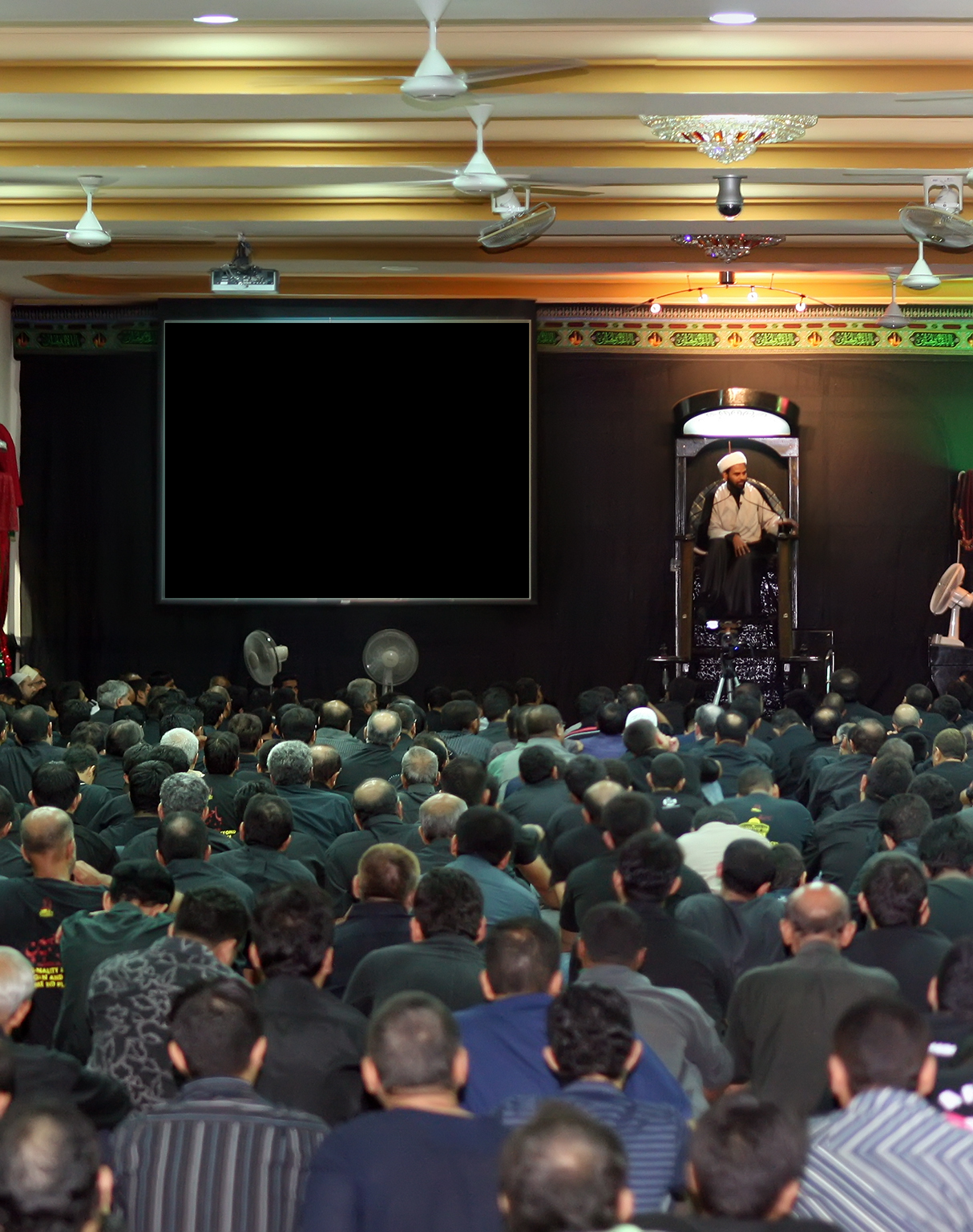
The ritual of Rowzeh-khani in Tanzania

The term Rowzeh-khani initially referred to the reading of the Rawzatu'sh-shuhada (Classical Persian: روضة الشهداء, romanized: Rawżatu'š-šuhadāʾ, lit. 'Garden of the Martyrs'), the title (originating from Arabic) of a book in Persian composed by Husayn Kashifi in 1502 in Herat. Gradually, the word rowzeh (taken from the title of the book) became a common word to denote the recitation of the tragedy of Karbala.

The word Rowzeh-khan (Note: Modern Iranian Persian: روضه‌خوان, romanized: Rowze-xân.) or Rawza-khwan (Note: Classical Persian: روضه‌خوان, romanized: Rawża-xwān.) (lit. 'reader of the Garden [of the Martyrs]') refers to the person who recites chapters of the Garden of the Martyrs. After a while the story teller strived to gain new techniques and texts to performing the Rowzeh-khani. When new Maqtal al-Husayn books (various books which narrate the story of the battle of Karbala and the death of Husayn ibn Ali) were authored by different writers, the story tellers decided to use these books as texts of recitation of rowzeh. Tufan al-Buka (tempest of tear) of Muhammad Ibrahim Jawhari, Asrar al-shahada (Mysteries of Martyrdom) of Ali Asghar Tabatabai are the most popular books that replace the Garden of the Martyrs.

== Performance ==
Rowzeh-khani as public lamentation is held to commemorate the death of Husayn ibn Ali and his follower, suffering of his family during the Battle of Karbala, especially by Iranian Shia Muslims. During this ritual mourning, the Rowzeh-khan recites loudly chapters of the Garden of the Martyrs with innovative skills to mourners. The ritual of Rowzeh-khani can be held anywhere, such as public squares of cities and villages, yards of mosque or privet house, husayniyyas and the takyehs that were built from the eighteenth century for performing the mourning of Muharram. At first, this ritual mourning was held through the first ten days of the month of Muharram and then rowzeh was commemorated in Muharram and Safar but nowadays every day of the year it is held. In the 19th century, by the time of the Qajar dynasty, Rowzeh-khani had been used by actors of the ta'ziyeh. The origin place of rowzeh was Iran, but then at Bahrain this ritual is seen in its original form and at other places like India, the modified form of it is held.

== See also ==
- Marsiya
- Noha
- Soaz
- Ta'ziyeh
- Husayniyya
- Hosay

== Sources ==
- Thackston, Wheeler M. (1994). A Millennium of Classical Persian Poetry.
