= Maddah (religious singer) =

Islamic eulogist or panegyrist singer

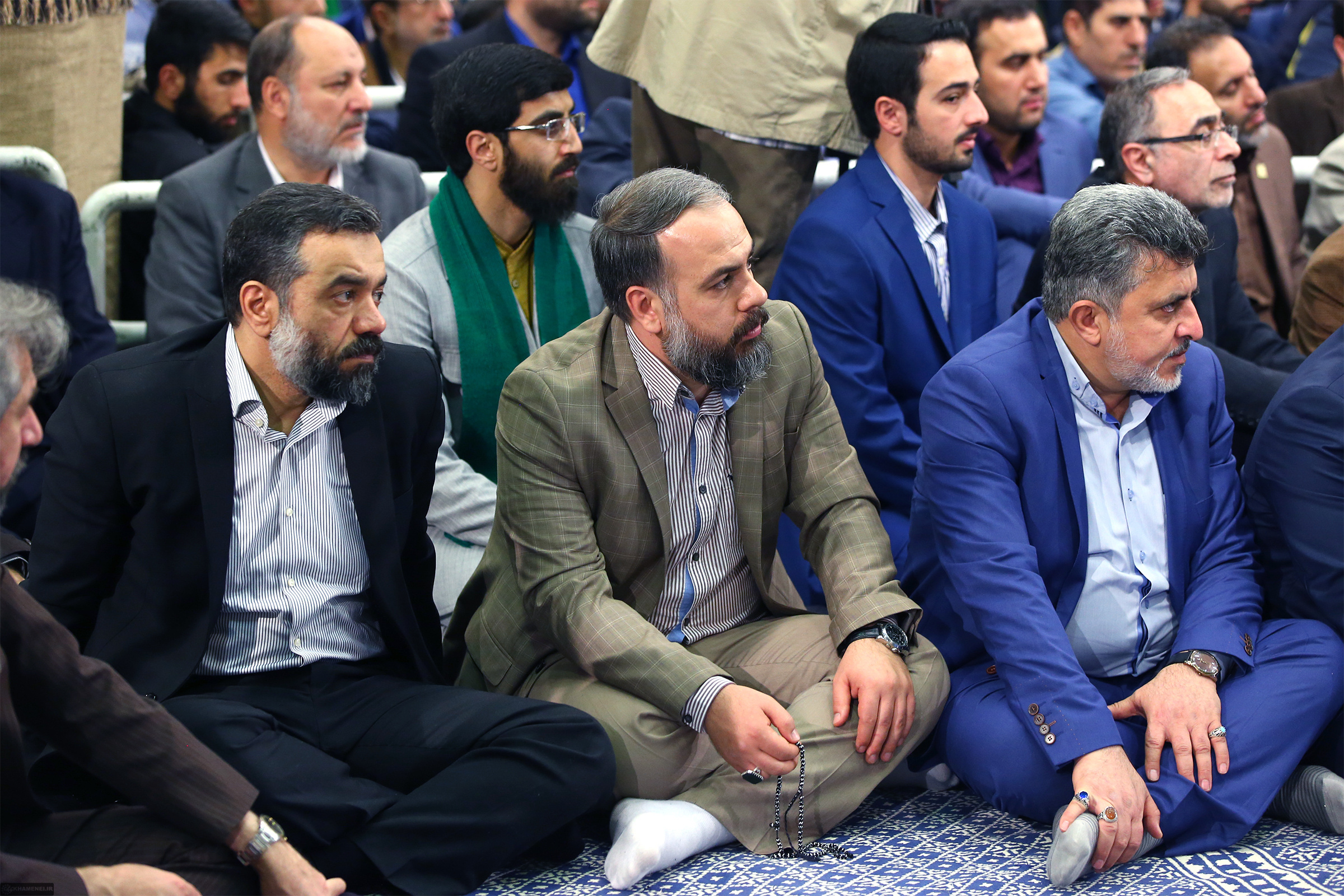
A group of Iranian Maddahs, in a gathering

Maddah (Persian: مداح), translated as eulogist or panegyrist; is attributed to a religious singer. There is a kind of religious singer(s) in Islamic culture who are called Maddah that often participate in --anniversary-- funeral ceremonies of Muslims, particularly for the famous characters among the Islamic prophet Muhammad and twelve Imams of Shia; and they recite or sing in Islamic/sad manner for people (as a type of mourning). The root of the word "Maddah" is "Madh" which means expressing the excellent traits of a character or a thing.

Maddah (or Dhakir) is an individual who mentions/praises the great characters and religious education in (religious) gatherings; and its performance ought to be mostly full of Eulogy/Marsiya; besides, Maddahi doesn't have special gender, age, group or elegy.

Idiomatically, Maddah means a dhakir or panegyrist who (often) stands beside the pulpit, and praises or turns into poetry about Ahlul-Bayt (and Muhammad) and their tragedy, particularly regarding the disasters/tragedy of battle of Karbala, and Husayn ibn Ali's manner of martyrdom who was killed there with his companions by the enemies.

== Notable maddahs ==
- Mahmoud Karimi
- Mahdi Rasouli
- Abdolreza Helali
- Mohammadreza Taheri

== See also ==
- Mourning of Muharram
- Banu Hashim
- Maddahi
- Dhikr
- Dua
