= Iran–Israel conflict =

Iran–Israel relations have been characterized by a series of conflicts over several decades. When used in reference to a more specific sphere of conflict or war, Iran–Israel conflict may refer to:

- Iran–Israel proxy conflict, a series of armed proxy conflicts since 1985
  - Iran–Israel conflict during the Syrian civil war, which shifted into direct confrontation in 2018
- 2024 Iran–Israel conflict, a series of bombings and strikes between the two countries in April, July, and October 2024
- Twelve-Day War, an armed conflict between Iran and Israel in June 2025
- 2026 Iran war, an ongoing war between Israel and Iran also involving the United States, Yemen, and other countries in the Middle East
