= Husayniyya =

Ceremonial gathering hall in Shia Islam

Husayniyya
A husayniyya in Dar es Salaam, Tanzania
Arabic	حسينية (ḥusayniyya) مأتم (maʾtam)
Azerbaijani	hüseyniyyə
Hindi	इमामबाड़ा (imāmbāṛā) आशुरख़ाना (āshurkhānā)
Bengali	ইমামবাড়া (imāmbāṛā)
Iranian Persian	حسینیه (hoseyniyeh) تکیه (takyeh) تکیه‌خانه (takyeh-khâneh)
Urdu	امام باڑہ (imāmbāṛā) امام بارگاہ (imāmbārgāh) عاشور خانہ (āshurkhānā) حسينيہ (ḥusainiya)

A husayniyya (Arabic: حسينية, romanized: ḥusayniyya) is a building designed specifically for gatherings of Shia Muslims for spiritual practice, religious education and commemoration ceremonies, especially the Mourning of Muharram. The husayniyya is a multipurpose hall for the commemoration rituals of Shia and gets its name from Husayn ibn Ali, the grandson of Muhammad. They are referred to as Takya among Sunni Muslims and share a common origin.

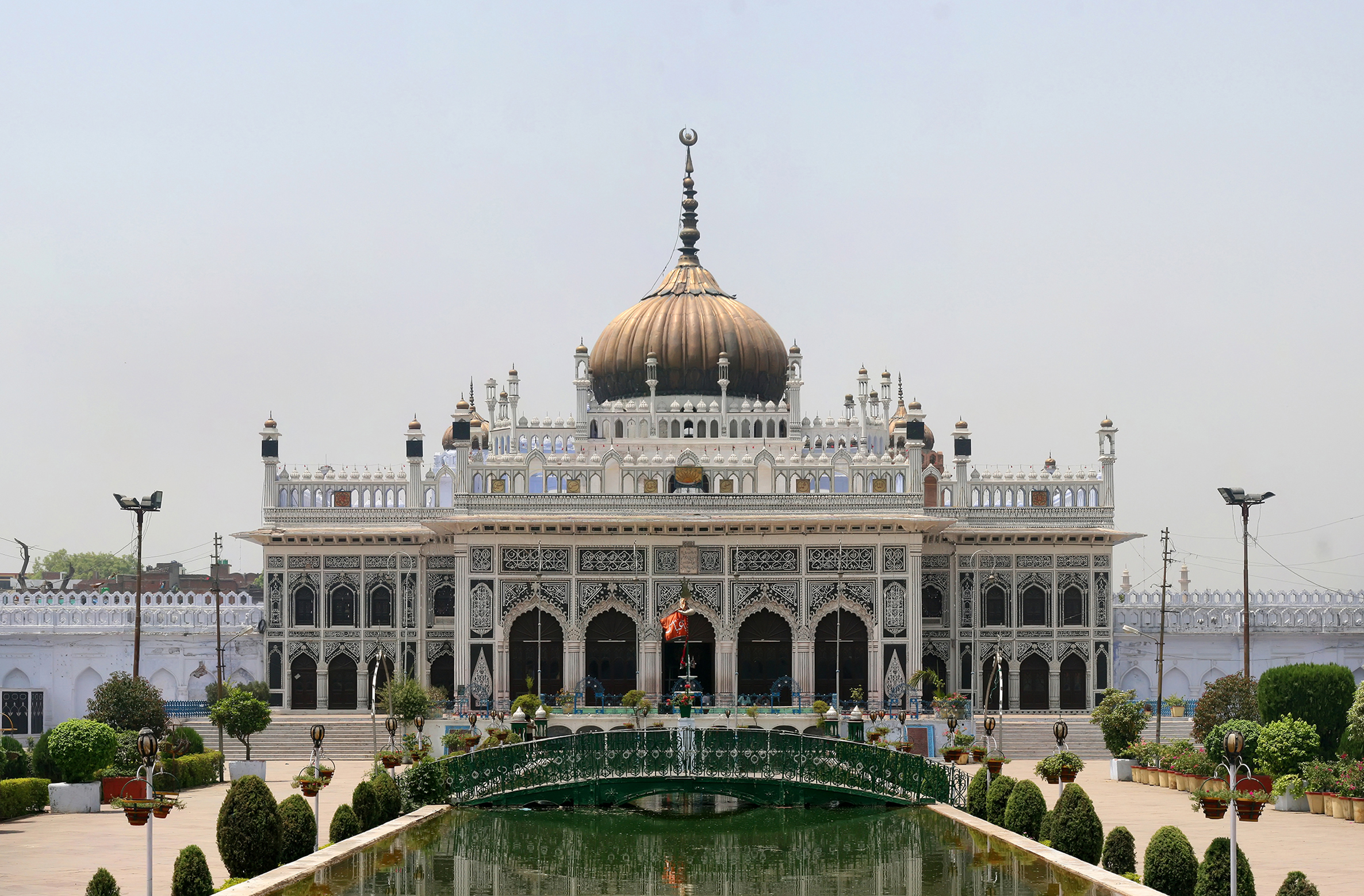
Chota Imambara in Lucknow, India

== Terminology ==
A husayniyya is different from a mosque. The name comes from Husayn ibn Ali, the third of the Twelve Imams and the grandson of the Islamic prophet Muhammad. Husayn was martyred at the Battle of Karbala on 10 October 680 CE on the orders of Yazid ibn Muawiya. The Shia commemorate his martyrdom every year on Ashura, the 10th day of Muharram. There are also other ceremonies which are held during the year in husayniyyas, including religious commemorations unrelated to Ashura, and may not necessarily hold jumu'ah (Friday congregational prayer).

In South Asia, a husayniyya can also be referred to as an imambara, imambargah, or ashurkhana. It is also often called a takyeh in Iran and takyakhana in Afghanistan (see takya). In Bahrain and the United Arab Emirates, as well as in other Gulf States it is called a ma'tam (Arabic: مأتم).

== History ==
From the time when the Safavid dynasty was ruling Iran, when Shia tended to hold the religious and mourning ceremonies, not only the passageways or the roofed places were used for the religious communities, even to make the husayniyehs and also takyehs became commonplace. Any husayniyeh had some booths (or rooms) and arcades, both in large and small sizes. Also in many alleys and streets, on the days near Ashoura, the religious people blackened the walls and the roofs and illuminated them, by the colorful lights... From the age of Zand dynasty, many bigger and vaster takyeh(s) was made just to hold ta'ziyeh, where there was a stage by the height of one meter from the floor, to show the different senses of ta'ziyeh. Expense of the husayniyya is provided by charitable donations and endowments.

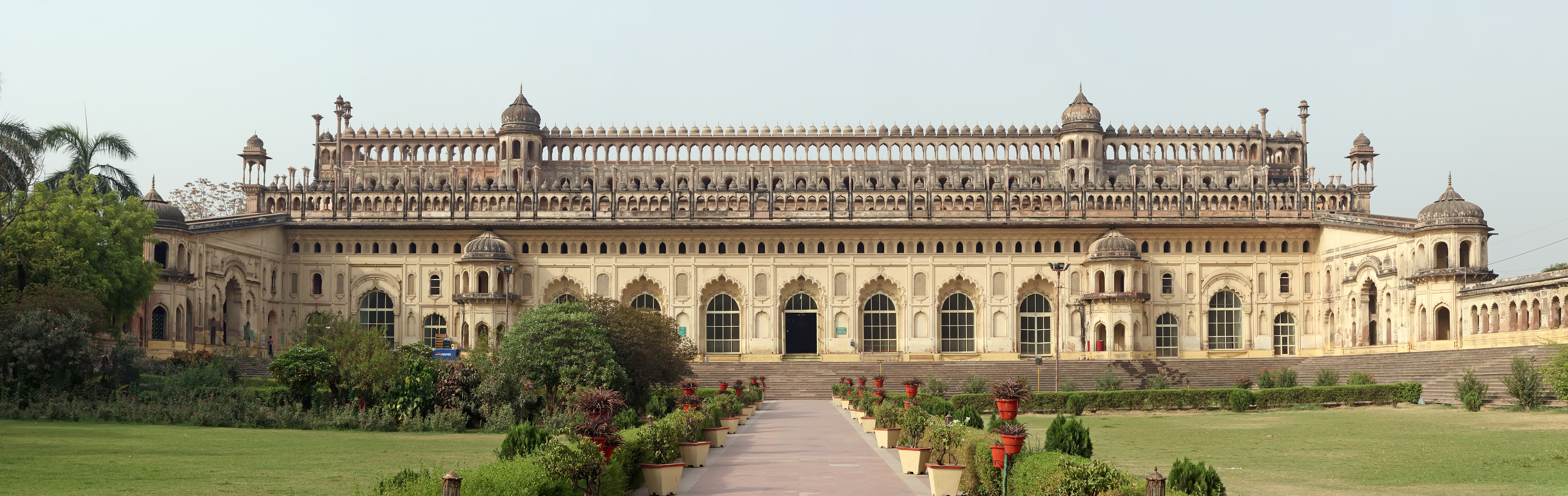
The Asifi Imambara in Lucknow, the capital city of the Indian state of Uttar Pradesh.

== Usage ==
The husayniyya was used during Muharram, Safar, and Ramadan for mourning, Rawda Khwani, Sineh Zani (a Customary form of mourning ceremony which shows their grief with chest-beating). Also, Hussainiya is a place for accommodations of passengers and pilgrims and feeding the poor.

Since husayniyya serves as a focal point for Shi’i gathering, it also plays a very significant role in consolidation of religious identity specially for Shi’i population in diaspora.

== Notable husayniyyas ==
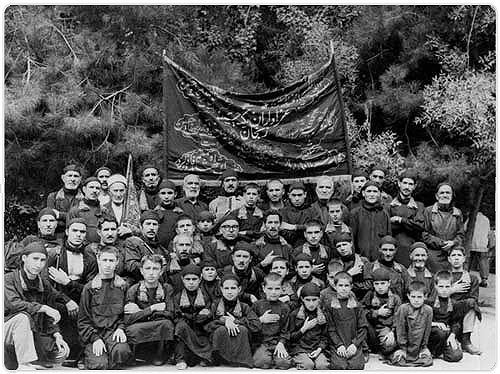
A historic image from Zanjan azam Hussainiya in Iran

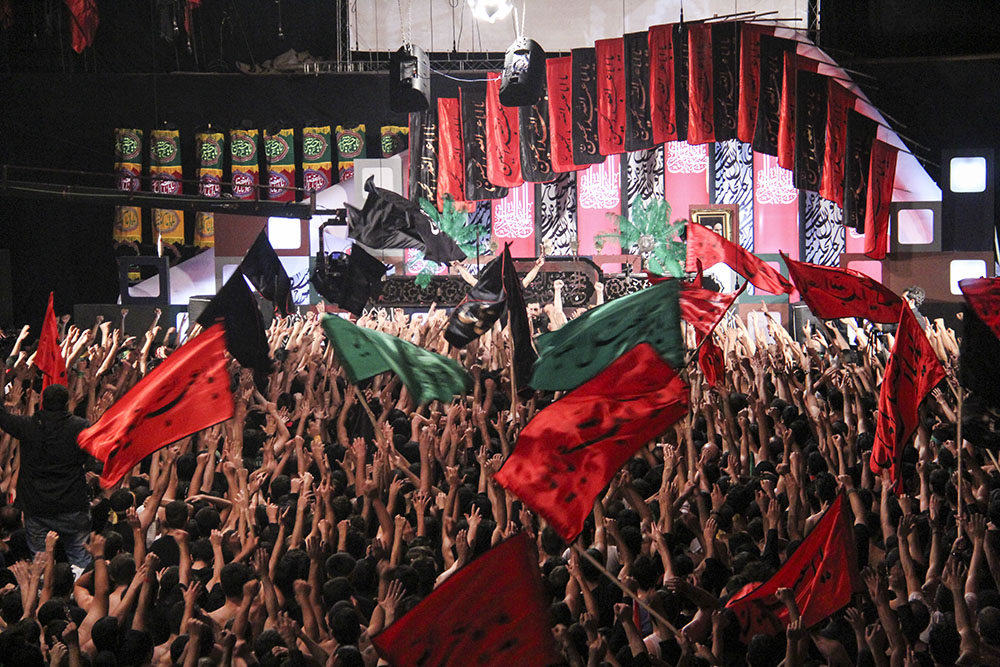
A husayniyya in Iran

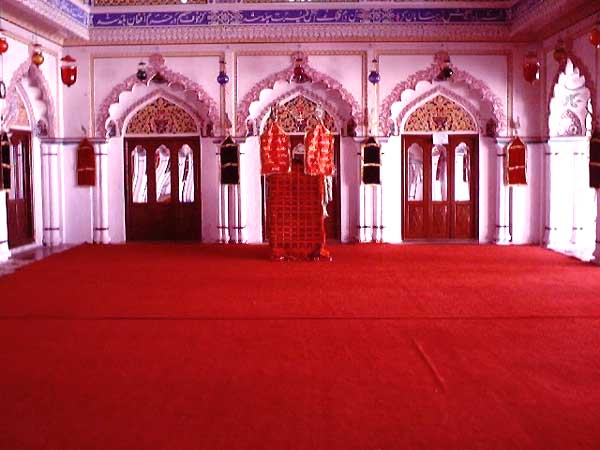
Imambara Wazeer Un Nisa in Amroha, India

- Hosseinieh Azam Zanjan Mosque, in Zanjan, Iran
- Azakhana Syed Dost Ali, Mohallah Katkoi, Amroha, built in 1766/1767
- Hussaini Dalan, in Dhaka, Bangladesh
- Prithimpasha Nawab Bari Imambara, in Kulaura, Bangladesh
- Bara Imambara, in Lucknow, India
- Chhota Imambara, in Lucknow, India
- Hooghly Imambara, in Hooghly (W.B.), India
- Nizamat Imambara, in Murshidabad, India
- Badshahi Ashurkhana, in Hyderabad, India
- Dar uz Zehra, Alipur, Karnataka, India.
- Hosseiniyeh Ershad, in Tehran, Iran
- Hussaini Imambara Asim Raza Abdi, in 100/46, Colonel Ganj Kanpur,
- Imambara Ghufran Ma'ab, in Lucknow, India
- Imambargah Mir Vilayat Husain, in Karari Allahabad, India
- Azakhana Wazeer-un-Nisa, located in Amroha, India. The Azakhana was built in 1802 (1226 Hijri) with one Mosque.
- Imambargah Haveli Sa'daat, one of the oldest Imambargahs in Gujranwala, Pakistan. It was built by the Naqvi Sadat family, who migrated from Fatehgarh Churian, Punjab, India.
- Imambargah Bait Aal e Imran, in Kotla Arab Ali Khan, Gujrat, Pakistan. The site was donated by Choudhary Ghulam Hassan, a sunni by birth, and his wife in 1979.
- Imam Bargah mosque, Afghanistan, targeted in the 2021 Kandahar bombing

== See also ==
- Ashura
- Mourning of Muharram
- Ta'ziyeh
- Chup Tazia
- Muharram Rebellion
- Battle of Karbala
- Husayn ibn Ali
- Tasu'a
- Imambaras of Lucknow
- Rowzeh-khani
