= Maddahi =

Shia Islamic ceremonial singing style

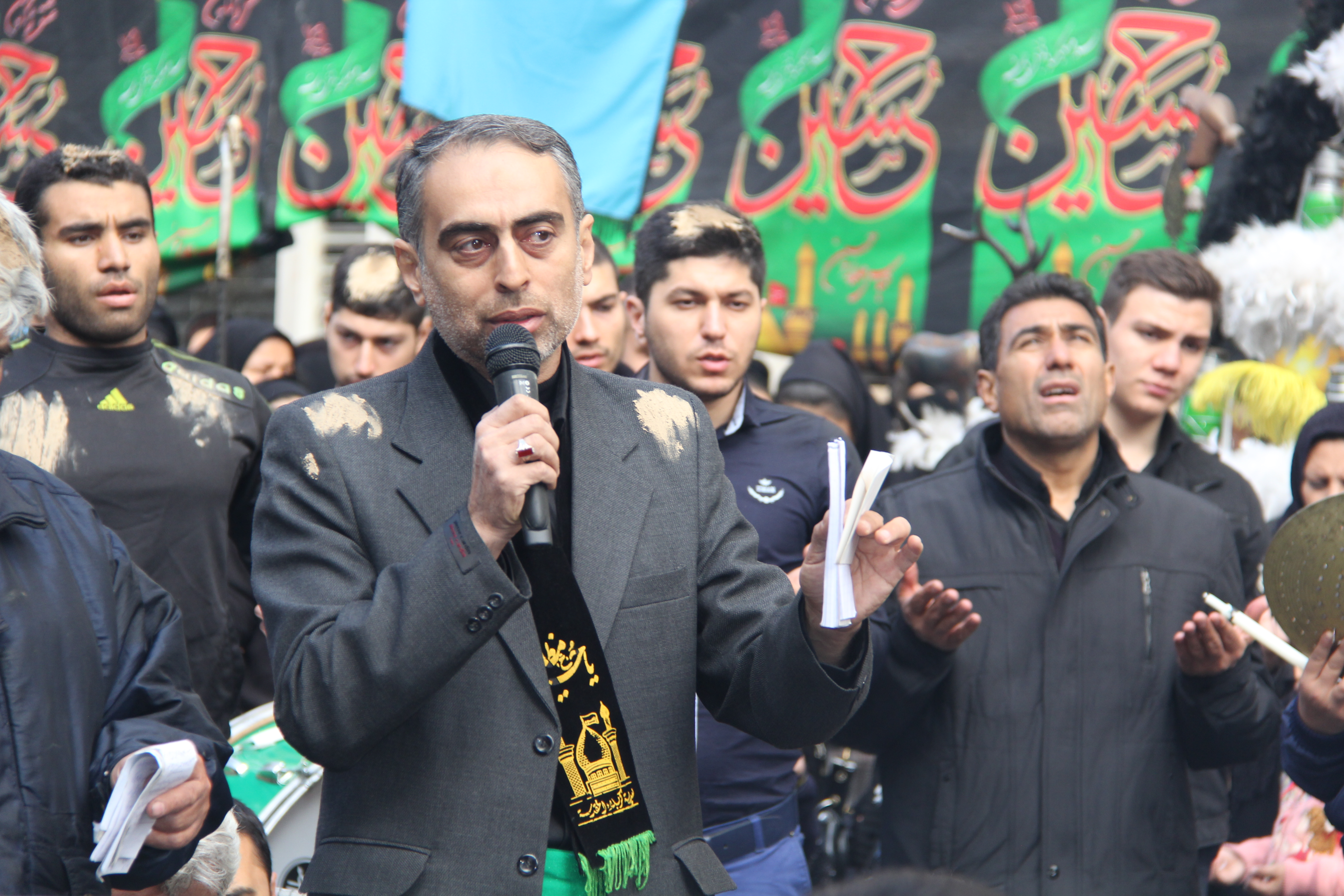
An Iranian Maddah

Maddahi is a ceremonial singing or eulogy recitation especially for Shia Muslims. The word Maddahi means "to praise" in Arabic. One who sings this style is called a maddah. Maddahs mostly sing on Ahl al-Bayt's birth and death anniversary. The theme of Maddahi may be joyous or sorrowful. Most maddahs are men but some women perform in exclusively female gatherings. The majority of maddahis are sung in mourning of Ahl al-Bayt, particularly at the Mourning of Muharram in the beginning of Muharram until the Day of Ashura and Arba'een.

== See also ==
- Muharram
- Maddah
- Ashura
- Tasua
