= Noha =

Shia elegy about the tragedy of Husayn ibn Ali

A Nowheh, Nohay or Noha (Persian: نوحه nowheh, Urdu: نوحہ; translit. nūḥa/nawḥa; Azerbaijani: Növhə/Нөвһә/نؤوحه), when interpreted in light of Shia views, is an elegy about the martyrdom of Husayn ibn Ali and his family and companions in the Battle of Karbala.

Marsiya and Nowheh have the historical and social milieu of pre-Islamic Arabic and Persian culture. The sub-parts of Marsiya are called Nowheh and Soaz, which means lamentation. It is usually a poem of mourning. Lamentation has a central part in the literature of the followers and devotees of the Shia sect and its offshoots. The tradition of elegizing Hussain and the tragedy of Karbala is not limited to Arabic or Persian speaking poets. Poets from different languages have also contributed significant poetic literature in their language. Poets who recite nowheh are called nohakhawan.

In the Urdu language, many poets such as Mir Anis and Mirza Dabeer have contributed much to Marsiya and its sub-branch, Nowheh. In a similar way, many English poets (whether Shi'a Muslim or from any other religion) have also made significant contributions to produce elegies for Imam Hussain and the tragic incidents of Karbala.

== Kashmiri Nowheh ==
Noha is a specific genre that commemorates the martyrdom of Husayn ibn Ali in Urdu language, and is itself separate from classical Marsiya. In Kashmir during the mid 20th century, a new genre began to develop parallel to classical Kashmiri marsiya that was observed free from literary conventions, techniques and standard forms of prosody, spontaneously came to know as "Nowha", and locally preferred as "Koshur Nowha" however initially called "روان". Before this evolution, Kashmir has its own rich heritage of commemorating the martyrdom of Husayn ibn Ali in native Kashmiri language through much evolved historical to classical Kashmiri Marsiya. Kashmiri nowha has historically not competed with traditional marsiya given the local ceremonial context. However in 1923, a first of its kind, free elegiac verses were recited from Kamangarpora in downtown city of Srinagar as the muharram procession commenced towards Shia dominated Zadibal, for the first time beyond the dawn Years later, Mirza Ghulam Mehdi Beigh of sonwar, later migrated to Daulat Abad, Nowpora in Srinagar gave a proper standardized form to Kashmiri Nowha, and began to recite a macaronic styled nowha himself "Aye Gul-e-gulzar Ali Akbaram Urdu: اے گلِ گلزار علی اکبرم" that is still being recited by his descendant Manzoor Hussain Beig with zuljanah processions of capital city. With decades after, kashmiri nowha became so popular that all contingents of mourners in Kashmir tried their skill in reciting and evolving this genre. Later, Kagazgar family in Srinagar also came to the forefront and began to compose a parallel genre Nowha, in comparison to Marsiya.

With regard to literary techniques, prosody is essential element now as the metre of nauha should be synchronous with rhythm of flagellation or chest hitting practice. Few new type nowhas are influenced by Iraqi latmiya, with a lapse of one beat.

== See also ==
- Mourning of Muharram
- Juloos
- Rawda Khwani
- Marsiyah
- Majalis
