= Islamization of Knowledge (book) =

1981 book by IIIT

Islamization of Knowledge: General Principles and Work Plan
- Cover of the 1989 edition
- Author: Ismail al-Faruqi and Abdul Hamid AbuSulayman
- Language: English
- Series: Islamization of Knowledge Series, No. 1
- Subject: Islamic studies, Islamic education
- Published: 1981
- Publisher: International Institute of Islamic Thought (IIIT)
- Publication place: United States
- Media type: Print
- Pages: 126
- ISBN: 9780912463254
- OCLC: 18982775
- Preceded by: The Hijrah: The Necessity of Its Iqamat or Vergegenwartigung
- Followed by: Al-Tawhid: Its Implications for Thought and Life
- Revised and expanded in 1989

Islamization of Knowledge: General Principles and Work Plan is a book published by the International Institute of Islamic Thought (IIIT) in 1981. The primary authors are Ismail al-Faruqi, who played a significant role in the initial edition, and Abdul Hamid AbuSulayman, who revised and expanded the work in later editions.

The book outlines a comprehensive strategy for integrating Islamic principles with contemporary education and knowledge systems. It addresses the intellectual and methodological challenges within the Muslim world and proposes reforms to align modern disciplines with Islamic values. The work is considered influential in the field of Islamic education reform.

== Background ==
Islamization of Knowledge: General Principles and Work Plan was developed in response to the intellectual and cultural challenges that emerged in the Muslim world following periods of colonialism and Western influence. Muslim intellectuals and scholars identified a crisis in the educational and intellectual sectors, largely driven by a disconnect from Islamic values and an overreliance on Western paradigms. The IIIT, founded by a group of scholars and activists, aimed to address these issues by proposing a revitalized educational system.

This system was envisioned to produce scholars and professionals who are both grounded in Islamic values and proficient in modern sciences and humanities. The book reflects the belief that the decline of the Ummah can be reversed through the strategic integration of Islamic principles with contemporary knowledge systems.

== Contents ==
=== Introduction ===
The introduction provides a historical context, highlighting the challenges faced by the Muslim Ummah. It argues that the decline is deeply rooted in intellectual and cultural issues, not just political or economic factors.

=== Chapter I: The Problem ===
This chapter examines the multifaceted issues affecting the Muslim world, including political fragmentation, economic underdevelopment, and cultural decline. It identifies the core problem as an intellectual and methodological decline, perpetuated by an inadequate educational system.

=== Chapter II: The Task ===
The authors propose a unified educational system that integrates Islamic and modern knowledge while maintaining an Islamic vision. They argue for eliminating the dualism between Islamic and secular education to create a cohesive curriculum that reflects Islamic values. This chapter also emphasizes the importance of instilling a comprehensive Islamic worldview in all educational disciplines.

=== Chapter III: Traditional Methodology ===
This chapter critiques traditional Islamic educational methods, which are viewed as rigid and disconnected from contemporary issues. It advocates for a more dynamic approach to Islamic law (Fiqh), integrating reason and revelation and bridging the gap between intellectual pursuits and practical actions.

=== Chapter IV: First Principles of Islamic Methodology ===
The authors outline the foundational principles of Islamic thought, including the unity of Allah (Tawhid), the unity of creation, and the unity of knowledge and truth. They emphasize the importance of understanding human roles as trustees and vicegerents of Allah on earth, responsible for upholding justice and righteousness.

=== Chapter V: Agenda of the Institute ===
This chapter details the objectives and stages of the IIIT's efforts in Islamizing knowledge. It includes specific plans for creating awareness, crystallizing Islamic thought, mastering the legacy of Islamic scholarship, and integrating contemporary knowledge. It also discusses the need for a specialized legacy series to make classical Islamic texts accessible to modern scholars.

=== Chapter VI: Indispensable Clarifications ===
The authors explain the distinction between general Islamization and the specific Islamization of knowledge. They stress the importance of mastering both modern sciences and Islamic heritage to address contemporary challenges effectively.

=== Chapter VII: Financial Requirements ===
This chapter discusses the financial strategies necessary to support the proposed educational reforms. The authors highlight the need for endowments and investments to ensure the sustainability of these initiatives.

=== Appendices ===
The appendices include working agendas from various international conferences on the Islamization of knowledge, providing detailed plans and resolutions.

== Themes ==
The book's central theme is the intellectual and methodological reform necessary for the revival of the Muslim ummah. It emphasizes the need for an intellectual renaissance grounded in Islamic principles while engaging with contemporary knowledge. The authors argue that integrating Islamic and modern educational systems is crucial for creating a cohesive curriculum that eliminates dualism and reflects Islamic values.

Another significant theme is the importance of understanding and teaching Islamic civilization. The book argues that a strong sense of identity and purpose among Muslim students can only be achieved through comprehensive courses on Islamic civilization. This knowledge is essential for counteracting secular influences and fostering a clear sense of self-identity.

The book also explores the role of education as a tool for cultural and spiritual rejuvenation. The authors advocate for an educational system that produces leaders and scholars who can navigate and contribute to the modern world while upholding Islamic values. They argue that education must impart an Islamic vision and cultivate the will to realize it on a large scale.

== Reception and Influence ==
Islamization of Knowledge: General Principles and Work Plan has been influential in academic and educational circles within the Muslim world. It has inspired numerous conferences, research projects, and educational reforms aimed at integrating Islamic perspectives with contemporary disciplines. The book has been a subject of discussion and critique among scholars, particularly regarding its feasibility and implementation in diverse educational contexts. Its call for a balanced approach that respects both divine revelation and rational inquiry has resonated with those seeking a holistic educational framework.

== Publication ==
The first edition of Islamization of Knowledge: General Principles and Work Plan was published in 1981 by the International Institute of Islamic Thought. The book was revised and expanded, with the second edition released in 1989, edited by Abdul Hamid AbuSulayman. This revised edition included additional concepts and ideas, reflecting ongoing discourse and developments in the field of Islamic education. The work remains a key reference for scholars and educators involved in the Islamization of knowledge, offering a detailed plan for educational reform that aligns with Islamic values.
