= Fazlur Rahman Malik =

Pakistani modernist Islamic scholar and reformer, 1919–1988

Fazlur Rahman Malik فضل الرحمان ملک
- Born: 21 September 1919; Hazara District, North West Frontier Province, British India
- Died: 26 July 1988 (aged 68); Chicago, Illinois, United States

Academic background
- Education: Punjab University (MA); Oxford University (PhD)

Academic work
- Era: Contemporary Islamic philosophy, 20th-century philosophy
- Doctoral students: Faisal Devji
- Main interests: Islamic Modernism, ijtihad
- Notable works: Avicenna's Psychology, Islamic Methodology in History, Islam and Modernity: Transformation of an Intellectual Tradition
- Influenced: Abdullahi Ahmed An-Na'im, Nurcholish Madjid, Abdullah Saeed, Amina Wadud, Mohamed Talbi, Ebrahim Moosa
- Fazlur Rahman's voice Excerpt from a recording of Fazlur Rahman's voice.

Fazlur Rahman Malik (/ˈfɑːzlʊər ˈrɑːmɑːn ˈmælɪk/ FAHZ-luhr RAH-mahn MAL-ik; Urdu: فضل الرحمان ملک; 21 September 1919 – 26 July 1988), commonly known as Fazlur Rahman, was a modernist scholar and Islamic philosopher from present-day Pakistan. Recognized as a leading liberal reformer within Islam, he focused on educational reform and promoting independent reasoning (ijtihad). His work has attracted both significant interest and criticism in Muslim-majority countries. His reformist ideas led to protests by over a thousand clerics, faqihs, muftis, and teachers in Pakistan, ultimately resulting in him leaving Pakistan.

After teaching in the UK and in Canada, where he formed a close friendship with philosopher Ismail al-Faruqi, Fazlur Rahman was appointed head of Pakistan’s Central Institute of Islamic Research in 1962. While widely respected among Islamic reformers, his ideas drew strong criticism from conservative scholars who viewed his approach as excessively liberal. Political opponents of his ally, General Ayub Khan, capitalized on this dissent, ultimately leading to Fazlur Rahman’s departure from Pakistan in 1968. He relocated to the United States, where he taught at the University of California, Los Angeles and later at the University of Chicago.

== Biography ==
=== Early life and education ===
Fazlur Rahman was born in the Hazara District of the North West Frontier Province (now Khyber Pakhtunkhwa) of British India (now Pakistan). His father, Maulana Shihab al-Din, was a prominent scholar who had studied at Deoband and held the title of alim through his expertise in Islamic law, prophetic narrations, Quranic commentaries, logic, philosophy, and other subjects. Under his father’s influence, Fazlur Rahman was introduced to traditional Islamic sciences and completed the memorization of the Quran at the age of ten. He pursued formal studies in Arabic at Punjab University, and later completed his doctoral studies at Oxford University, where he wrote a dissertation on Ibn Sina.

=== Early career ===
After completing his studies, Fazlur Rahman began his teaching career, initially at Durham University, where he taught Persian and Islamic philosophy. He later joined McGill University, where he taught Islamic studies until 1961. During his time at McGill, he formed a close association with the Palestinian-American philosopher Ismail al-Faruqi, introduced through Wilfred Cantwell Smith, the founder of McGill’s Institute of Islamic Studies. Under Smith’s mentorship, al-Faruqi delved deeply into Christian and Jewish theological studies, with Fazlur Rahman observing that Smith's guidance significantly shaped al-Faruqi’s comparative approach to religious studies and interfaith dialogue.

=== Return to Pakistan ===
In 1961, Fazlur Rahman returned to Pakistan at the request of President Ayub Khan to lead the Central Institute of Islamic Research in Karachi, which had been established by the Pakistani government to integrate Islamic principles into the nation’s public affairs. He also supported a two-year appointment for al-Faruqi at the Institute, where al-Faruqi served as a visiting professor. Reflecting on this period, Fazlur Rahman noted that the experience broadened al-Faruqi’s understanding of cultural diversity within Islam, ultimately shaping his approach to comparative religion and meta-religion. Despite his efforts, the political climate in Pakistan presented significant obstacles to Fazlur Rahman’s vision. Orthodox ulema opposed his modernist interpretations, and as Ayub Khan’s political influence waned, Fazlur Rehman ultimately resigned from the position in September 1968 and relocated to the United States.

=== Career in the United States ===
In the United States, Fazlur Rahman resumed his teaching career, first as a visiting professor at UCLA for a year. In 1969, he joined the University of Chicago, where he became the Harold H. Swift Distinguished Service Professor of Islamic Thought. At Chicago, he played an instrumental role in building a strong Near Eastern Studies program, which continues to be highly regarded. Fazlur Rahman also advocated for reform within Islamic governance and served as an advisor to the State Department.

He died in Chicago, Illinois on July 26, 1988, at the University of Chicago Medical Center due to complications from coronary bypass surgery. At the time of his death, he was a resident of suburban Naperville, Illinois and is buried in Arlington Cemetery, Elmhurst, Illinois.

=== Legacy ===
Since Fazlur Rahman’s death, his writings have remained influential among scholars of Islam and the Near East in various countries, including Pakistan, Malaysia, Indonesia, Turkey, and the Arab region. His impact at the University of Chicago endures, particularly within its programs related to Islamic and Near Eastern studies. In his honor, the Center for Middle Eastern Studies at the University of Chicago named its common area after him, recognizing his many years of service and contributions to the university. A polyglot, he mastered Urdu, Persian, Arabic, and English early in life and later learned classical Greek, Latin, German, and French to further his academic work.

== Views ==
Fazlur Rahman’s philosophy emphasized a return to the intellectual dynamism of early Islam, advocating a dynamic approach to religious interpretation. He believed in integrating philosophy, ethics, and rational thought to address contemporary issues facing the Muslim world. Fazlur Rahman criticized traditional Muslim theologies for overlooking the Quran’s moral principles, stressing that "moral values" endure beyond history and require constant reinterpretation. His work Islam and Modernity (1982) outline these ideas seeking to reconcile Islamic principles with modern challenges.

=== Social justice ===
Fazlur Rahman argued that Islamic tradition often prioritized judicial codes over developing a Quran-based ethical framework. Viewing historical Islamic governance models, such as the caliphate, as past solutions for societal justice, he called for a reformed understanding of justice rooted in the Quranic concept of shura (consultation). He proposed expanding shura to involve all levels of society, advocating collaboration between religious and secular scholars to address social justice issues.

=== Riba' and economic reform ===
Addressing riba (interest), Fazlur Rahman diverged from the strict prohibition stance of many Islamic revivalist movements. He contended that the Quran’s condemnation of riba referred specifically to exploitative, compounding interest in pre-Islamic Arabia, not moderate loan interest. Fazlur Rahman cited the Muwatta of Imam Malik to support his view, arguing for a nuanced interpretation that bans predatory lending while allowing interest in modern banking. This perspective directly opposed figures like Abul A'la Maududi, who advocated a total ban on interest. He wrote that “the initial interest itself was not usurious and was, therefore, not considered riba. What made it riba was the increase … that raised the principal several-fold by continued redoubling.”

=== Reform movements and intellectual revival ===
Fazlur Rahman was critical of both revivalist and modernist Islamic movements. He argued that 18th- and 19th-century revivalists stifled intellectual growth, while modernists selectively applied Islamic principles without grounding them in a robust methodology. Instead, he championed a "neo-modernism" rooted in a disciplined Islamic framework, advocating for a revival of rational inquiry within Islamic scholarship. His "double movement theory" reflects this approach by encouraging a balanced interpretation of Islamic teachings through context and present-day application, which has been highlighted as essential to fostering religious moderation.

=== Contextual interpretation of the Quran ===
Fazlur Rahman contributed significantly to the development of a contextual approach to examining the Qur’an, arguing that readers must consider both the historical context in which the text was revealed and contemporary social changes. This approach, which he described as a “twofold movement,” involves understanding the Qur’an’s teachings as specific to its time but also adaptable to modern society’s evolving needs.

Some Islamic feminist scholars, such as Amina Wadud and Sa’diyyah Shaikh, have cited Fazlur Rahman’s contextual methodology as an inspiration for their own interpretations of the Qur’an, particularly in advocating for gender equality within Islamic teachings. Scholars such as Tamara Sonn and Na’eem Jeenah have noted that his ideas align with an “Islamic Feminist Hermeneutic” approach, demonstrating the broader relevance of his methodology in modern Islamic discourse.

== See also ==
- Contemporary Islamic philosophy

== Bibliography ==
- Avicenna's Psychology. London: Oxford University Press. 1952.
- Islam (2nd ed.). University of Chicago Press. 1979. ISBN 0-226-70281-2.
- Prophecy in Islam: Philosophy and Orthodoxy (2011 ed.). University of Chicago Press. 1979. ISBN 9780226702858.
- Islam and Modernity: Transformation of an Intellectual Tradition. University of Chicago Press. 1982. ISBN 0-226-70284-7.
- Major Themes of the Qur'an. University of Chicago Press. 2009. ISBN 978-0-226-70286-5.
- Ebrahim Moosa, ed. (1999). Revival and Reform in Islam. Oneworld Publications. ISBN 1-85168-204-X.
- Islamic Methodology in History. Central Institute of Islamic Research. 1965.
- "Riba and Interest" (PDF). Islamic Studies. 3 (1). Karachi: 1–43. March 1964. Archived from the original (PDF) on 2016-03-03.
- "Shariah". Chapter from Islam, Anchor Book, 1968. pp. 117–137. Archived from the original on 29 February 2008.
