= Ismail al-Faruqi =

Palestinian-American Islamic scholar (1921–1986)

Ismaʿil al-Faruqi
- إسماعيل راجي الفاروقي
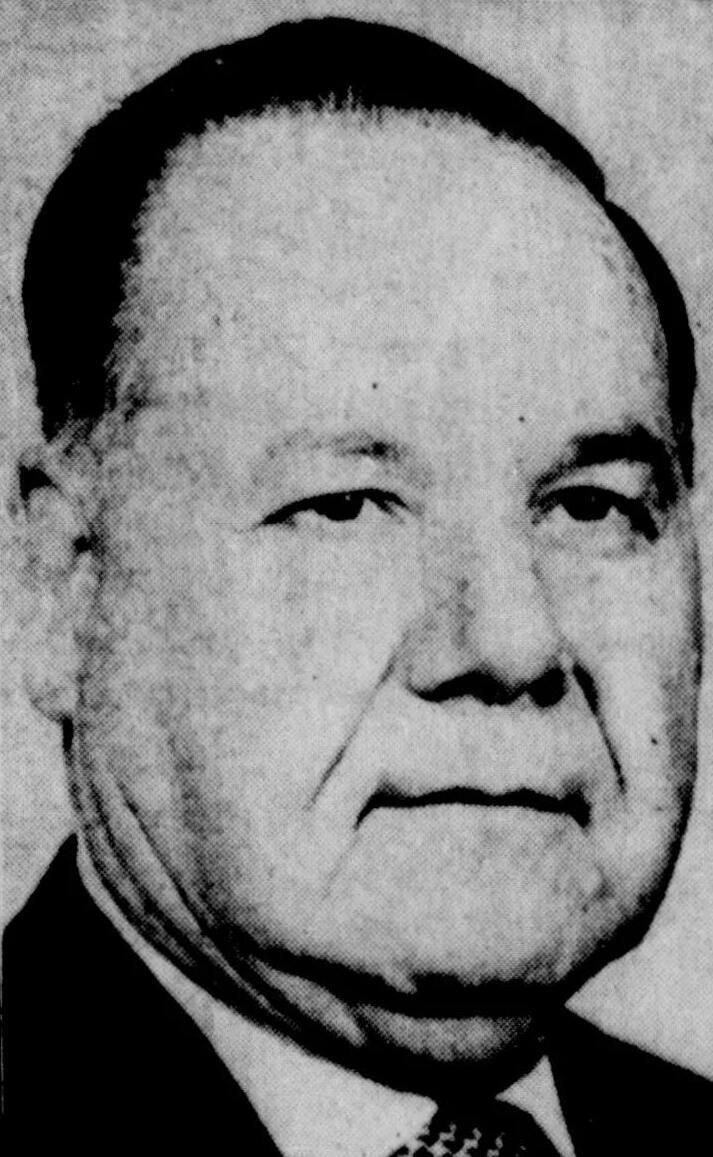
- Undated photo of Al-Faruqi
- Born: 1 January 1921; Jaffa, Mandatory Palestine
- Died: 27 May 1986 (aged 65); Wyncote, Pennsylvania, United States
- Cause of death: Murder by stabbing
- Resting place: Forest Hills Cemetery, Pennsylvania; 40.1303°N 75.0253°W
- Spouse: Lois Lamya al-Faruqi (m. 1951; died 1986)
- Children: 5

Academic background
- Education: American University of Beirut (BA); Indiana University (MA, PhD); Harvard University (MA); Al-Azhar University

Academic work
- Era: Contemporary Islamic philosophy, 20th-century philosophy
- Discipline: Philosophy
- Sub-discipline: Comparative religion, Islamic studies
- Institutions: McGill University; Central Institute of Islamic Research; University of Chicago; Syracuse University; Temple University
- Main interests: Islam; Arabism; Judaism; Anti-Zionism; Christianity
- Notable works: Christian Ethics: A Historical and Systematic Analysis of its Dominant Ideas (1967); Islam and the Problem of Israel (1980); Al-Tawhid: Its Implications for Thought and Life (1982); The Cultural Atlas of Islam (co-authored with Lois Lamya al-Faruqi, 1986)
- Notable ideas: Meta-religion; Islamization of knowledge; Urubah (Arabism); Revival of ijtihad
- Isma'il al-Faruqi's voice Al-Faruqi talking about God and nature. Recording date unknown.
- Website: ismailfaruqi.com

Ismaʿil Raji al-Faruqi (Arabic: إسماعيل راجي الفاروقي, romanized: Ismāʿīl Rājī al-Fārūqī, pronounced [ʔis.maːˈʕiːl raːˈʤiː ʔal.faːˈruː.qiː]; January 1, 1921 – May 27, 1986) was a Palestinian-American Muslim philosopher and scholar of religion. He contributed significantly to Islamic studies, ethics, and interfaith dialogue, and is best known for pioneering the Islamization of knowledge and articulating tawhid (monotheism) as a comprehensive worldview. He proposed a model of meta-religion based on shared ethical values and the universal concept of divine unity.

Following his early education in Jaffa, al-Faruqi studied philosophy and theology at the American University of Beirut, Indiana University, and Al-Azhar University in Cairo. He taught at McGill University in Canada, then in Pakistan, and later at Syracuse University, where he produced the Historical Atlas of the Religions of the World (1974), a widely referenced work. He subsequently joined Temple University, where he founded and chaired the Islamic Studies program. A prolific author, he published over 100 scholarly articles and 25 books, including Christian Ethics: A Historical and Systematic Analysis of Its Dominant Ideas (1967) and Al-Tawhid: Its Implications for Thought and Life (1982). He also co-founded the International Institute of Islamic Thought (IIIT) and played an active role in interfaith and Muslim educational initiatives.

In May 1986, al-Faruqi and his wife, Lois Lamya al-Faruqi, were murdered in their home in Wyncote, Pennsylvania. Their deaths drew international attention and were widely mourned across academic and interfaith communities. His legacy endures through his writings, institutions, and influence on Islamic intellectual reform.

== Biography ==
=== Early life and education ===
Al-Faruqi was born in Jaffa, in British-mandate Palestine. His father, 'Abd al-Huda al-Faruqi, was an Islamic judge (qadi). Al-Faruqi received his early religious education at home and in the local mosque. His father's influence significantly shaped al-Faruqi's early religious and moral education. In 1936, he began attending the French Dominican Collège des Frères de Jaffa. Later al-Faruqi moved to Beirut, Lebanon, where he continued his studies at the American University of Beirut (AUB). At AUB, al-Faruqi was influenced by Arab nationalist movements and prominent Christian Arab nationalists such as Constantin Zureiq, Nabih Amin Faris and Nicola Ziadeh. These influences contributed to his adoption of Arabism. The academic environment at AUB included compulsory attendance of Christian missionary lectures and courses promoting Western modernity, which influenced his ideological development.

In 1942, he was appointed as a registrar in the Arab Cooperative Societies under the British Mandate government in Jerusalem. In 1945, he became the district governor of Galilee. Following the 1948 Arab-Israeli War, he enrolled at Indiana University, obtaining his M.A. in philosophy with a thesis titled The Ethics of Reason and the Ethics of Life (Kantian and Nietzschean Ethics) in 1949. He followed this with a second M.A. in philosophy from Harvard University in 1951 and earned his Ph.D. with a thesis titled On Justifying the Good from Indiana University in 1952. During this period, he met and married Lois Lamya al-Faruqi.

In his master's thesis, al-Faruqi examined the ethics of Immanuel Kant and Friedrich Nietzsche. His early philosophical work laid the groundwork for his later critiques of Western ethical systems and his development of Islamic ethical thought. In his doctoral thesis, al-Faruqi argued that values are absolute, self-existent essences known a priori through emotional intuition. He based his theories on Max Scheler's use of phenomenology and Nicolai Hartmann's studies in ethics. His studies led him to conclude that the absence of a transcendent foundation leads to moral relativism, prompting him to reassess his Islamic heritage.

Within six years of arriving in the United States, he recognized the need for a more thorough study of Islam, which led him to study at Egypt's Al-Azhar University from 1954 to 1958. By the time he left the United States, he had developed new questions about moral obligations and sought to integrate his intellectual pursuits with his Islamic identity.

=== Academic career ===
In 1958, al-Faruqi was offered a visiting fellowship at McGill University's Faculty of Divinity. He joined the Institute of Islamic Studies at the invitation of its founder, Wilfred Cantwell Smith, teaching alongside Smith from 1958 to 1961. During this time, he studied Christian theology and Judaism, becoming acquainted with Pakistani philosopher Fazlur Rahman. Fazlur Rahman observed that al-Faruqi's immersion in these traditions under Smith's mentorship was pivotal, refining his comparative outlook on religious studies and interfaith dialogue.

In 1961, Fazlur Rahman arranged a two-year appointment for al-Faruqi at the Central Institute of Islamic Research in Karachi, Pakistan, where he served as a visiting professor until 1963. While Rahman regarded this period as formative in deepening al-Faruqi's engagement with Islamic cultural diversity, al-Faruqi had already articulated his core ideas on comparative religion and meta-religion in 'Urubah and Religion, published in 1962. During his time in Karachi, he also contributed to the early volumes of the journal Islamic Studies, including the article “Towards a Historiography of Pre-Hijrah Islam,” published in its second issue in 1962.

In 1964, al-Faruqi returned to the United States, where he held concurrent roles as a visiting professor at the University of Chicago's Divinity School and as an associate professor at Syracuse University.

In 1968, he joined Temple University as a professor of religion, where he founded the Islamic Studies Program and held the position until he died in 1986. During his tenure at Temple University, al-Faruqi mentored many students, including his first doctoral student, John Esposito.

=== Death and burial ===
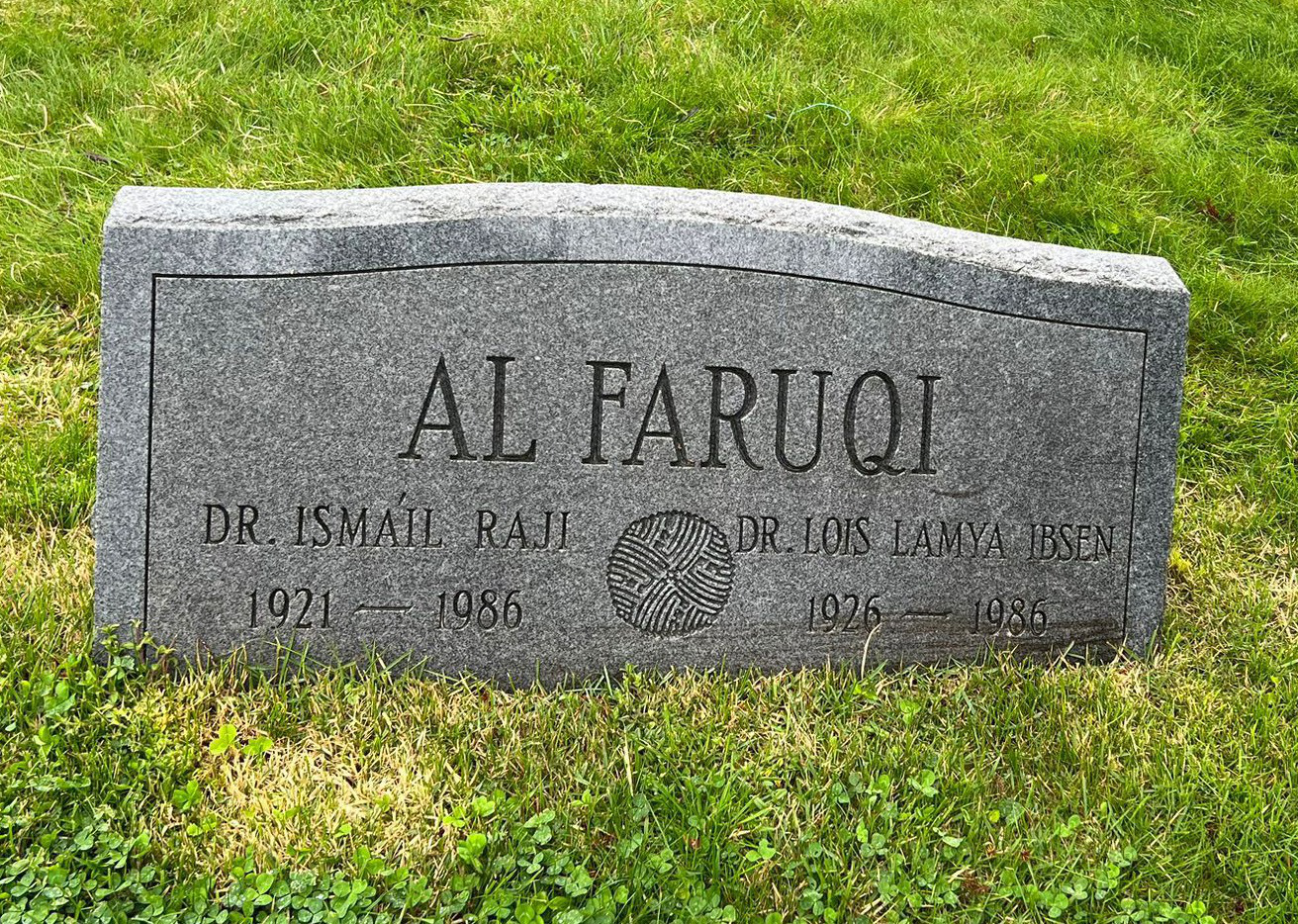
Shared grave marker of the Faruqis.

In May 1986, Ismail al-Faruqi and his wife, Lois Lamya al-Faruqi, were murdered at their home in Wyncote, Pennsylvania, by Joseph Louis Young, also known as Yusuf Ali. Young, who had prior associations with the local Muslim community, confessed to the crime, was sentenced to death, and died in prison of natural causes in 1996. Their daughter, Anmar el-Zein, who was pregnant at the time, survived multiple stab wounds and required extensive medical treatment.

During a conference at the International Islamic University Malaysia in 2008, Anis Ahmad shared that al-Faruqi had once confided in him about his father's two supplications: that he might become a great scholar and die as a shahid (martyr). Al-Faruqi is reported to have wondered, "Now I am a scholar, but how can I die a shahid in the US?" Malik Badri reflected that "Allah Ta'ala accepted both supplications."

== Philosophy and thought ==
=== Early thought: Arabism ===
Al-Faruqi's early intellectual focus centered on ‘urubah (Arabism), which he viewed as a unifying identity for Muslims and essential for understanding Islamic teachings due to Arabic being the language of the Qur’an. He argued that Islam and monotheism represented Arabism's key contributions to humanity and that revitalizing Arabic was necessary for restoring Islamic civilization. His conception of Arabism extended beyond nationalism, presenting it as a bridge across ethnic divides within Islam.

Central to al-Faruqi's thought was tawhid (monotheism), which he described as integral to Arab religious consciousness. He contended that the monotheistic foundations of Islam, Christianity, and Judaism underscored Arabism's global religious significance, contrasting this with ideologies that promoted division and nationalism. However, critics argued that his emphasis on Arabic as uniquely suited for Islamic thought risked marginalizing non-Arab Muslims and overlooked their historical intellectual contributions.

Over time, al-Faruqi's experiences abroad, particularly in Pakistan, led him to reconsider his Arab-centric perspective. Exposure to diverse Muslim societies broadened his understanding of Islamic unity beyond linguistic and ethnic boundaries, emphasizing a transnational Islamic civilization based on shared spiritual and ethical values. His later writings reflected this shift, advocating for a universal Islamic identity that transcended linguistic and cultural divisions.

=== Ethics and value theory ===
Al-Faruqi's philosophical inquiries included a critical analysis of Kantian ethics, particularly the concept of moral universality, which he sought to develop further within an Islamic ethical framework. In his PhD thesis, On Justifying the Good (1952), he examined the epistemological foundations of ethics and value theory, critically engaging with major Western ethical traditions. He identified two principal fallacies in their reasoning: the naturalistic fallacy and what he termed the dislocative fallacy. The naturalistic fallacy, according to al-Faruqi, involves conflating ethical value with empirical facts or human desires. In contrast, the dislocative fallacy refers to the attempt to derive a pluralistic ethic from a monistic axiology—a concept he introduced to critique systems that attempt to prescribe diverse ethical duties from a single notion of the Good without sufficient justification.

Al-Faruqi criticized utilitarian perspectives, particularly those of John Stuart Mill, for equating goodness with what is desired or produces happiness. He argued that this conflation reduces ethical value to subjective preferences, leading to ethical relativism. Drawing on the works of phenomenological thinkers such as Max Scheler and Nicolai Hartmann, he maintained that values are ideally self-existent, a priori, and knowable through emotional intuition rather than empirical observation. He insisted that knowledge of the good must precede moral obligation and that a coherent ethical system must begin with a sound axiology, where values are recognized as independent, absolute, and self-evident.

Al-Faruqi's dissertation provided a foundational framework for his later efforts to integrate Islamic principles into contemporary academic disciplines. His critique of Western ethical theories and his emphasis on value objectivity significantly influenced his broader concept of the Islamization of knowledge.

=== Shift to Islamism ===
Until a few months ago, I was a Palestinian, an Arab, and a Muslim. Now I am a Muslim who happens to be an Arab from Palestine.

— Isma'il al-Faruqi

Al-Faruqi's perspectives shifted significantly after relocating to the United States, where his involvement with the Muslim Students Association (MSA) at Temple University exposed him to a diverse array of Muslim students. This experience prompted him to reconsider his earlier emphasis on Arabism, moving instead toward a broader Islamic identity over Arab nationalism. Malik Badri described this transformation, noting that, "For the first time in his life, al-Faruqi met a group of young students who shattered his conceptualization of Arabism. He had to submit to Islam as the ummah's real binding force – especially since Arabs are only a small minority within it." Al-Faruqi himself articulated this shift by stating, "Until a few months ago, I was a Palestinian, an Arab, and a Muslim. Now I am a Muslim who happens to be an Arab from Palestine". He further remarked, "I asked myself: Who am I? A Palestinian, a philosopher, a liberal humanist? My answer was: I am a Muslim".

In his later years, al-Faruqi emphasized the significance of Islamic law as a framework for shaping ethical and societal norms. He described legal measures, such as penalties for theft and adultery, as deterrents designed to foster discipline and prevent societal harm. Al-Faruqi viewed these laws as part of a larger effort, centered on education, to instill ethical behavior and cultivate a just society.

In his exploration of Islam's role in North America, al-Faruqi also highlighted the historical contributions and challenges of African Muslims, from early settlement to the influences of Elijah Muhammad and Malcolm X on the Islamic movement among African Americans. His insights on the ethical foundations of Islam, the concept of the Ummah, and the responsibilities of Muslim immigrants have played a role in shaping the Muslim experience in North America.

This shift also influenced his approach to interfaith dialogue. Al-Faruqi believed that a unified Islamic identity was essential for fostering meaningful interactions with non-Muslim communities. His involvement in the MSA and his exposure to diverse Muslim backgrounds in the U.S. reinforced his commitment to a broader, inclusive Islamic identity over his earlier Arab-centric views.

=== Views on Tawhid ===
Al-Tawhid is that which gives Islamic civilization its identity, which binds all its constituents together and thus makes of them an integral, organic body which we call civilization. In binding disparate elements together, the essence of civilization in this case, al tawhid—impresses them by its own mould. It recasts them to harmonize with and mutually support other elements.

— Isma'il al-Faruqi

Al-Faruqi's views on tawhid included a critical perspective on Sufism, which he considered to emphasize mysticism and esoteric practices. He critiqued Sufism for its mysticism, arguing that it often detracted from the rational and practical aspects of Islam. Al-Faruqi was inspired by Mu'tazilī theologians such as al-Nazzam and Al-Qadi Abd al-Jabbar, who advocated for the use of reason and logic in understanding Islamic principles. Additionally, he found value in the works of the Brethren of Purity (Ikhwān al-Ṣafāʾ), whose writings combined Islamic teachings with elements of Greek philosophy.

Al-Faruqi's emphasis on tawhid went beyond theology, encompassing an integrated approach that unified rational thought, ethics, and social responsibility across all aspects of life. He argued that tawhid is "that which gives Islamic civilization its identity, which binds all its constituents together and thus makes of them an integral, organic body". Al-Faruqi explains:

To acknowledge that there is no god but Allah (SWT) is to recognize Him as sole Creator, Lord and Judge of the world. It follows from this witnessing that man was created for a purpose, since God does not work in vain; and that this purpose is the realization of the divine will as it pertains to this world in which human life finds its theater.

He also asserted that this principle "purges religion clean of all doubt regarding the transcendence and unicity of the Godhead." He emphasized that tawhid entails both the unicity and transcendence of the divine, affirming that if God alone is truly divine and all other beings—angels, spirits, and humans—are His creatures, then there is no threat to His ultimate authority. Only a God who is utterly beyond creation can fulfill the idea of ultimacy; without such transcendence, that claim collapses.

This approach extended to his vision of secularism and materialism, which he viewed as challenges to Islamic unity and ethical integrity. Al-Faruqi argued that Islam's vision for society requires an integrated worldview where tawhid "marks a complete secularization of the natural world to allow for the development of the sciences," thus separating the sacred from nature while upholding a unified ethical framework. His response to Western secular ideologies was rooted in a belief that tawhid calls for a holistic framework where reason and faith work together, as opposed to the spiritual-material divide seen in secular ideologies.

=== Meta-religion ===
Al-Faruqi sought to establish principles of meta-religion grounded in reason, aiming to evaluate religions by universal standards rather than by comparing them against each other. This approach was intended to find common ground for cooperation among diverse faiths. Central to his concept of meta-religion is a shared, intrinsic belief in the One God, which he argued represents the original "pure form of faith" predating the diversification of religions. As al-Faruqi envisioned, meta-religion is distinct from historical religion, focusing on universal principles rooted in fitrah (natural religion) as a basis for mutual understanding and interfaith cooperation.

Within this framework, din al-fitrah is an innate human disposition toward the divine, suggesting that meta-religion provides an internalized recognition of truth that transcends specific religious labels. This perspective supports a form of interfaith understanding that acknowledges shared spiritual foundations without equating the doctrinal specifics of each faith. Rather than affirming religious pluralism in its conventional sense, meta-religion upholds that religions mirror varying degrees of the original monotheistic truth inherent in human nature.

To facilitate dialogue, al-Faruqi proposed several guiding principles: all dialogue should be open to critique, communication must adhere to laws of internal and external coherence, dialogue should align with reality and remain free from "canonical figurizations," and discussions should emphasize ethical questions over theological disputes. Al-Faruqi's concept of meta-religion involves a belief in God or Ultimate Reality as the "totally other." He emphasized that Islam, as a universal meta-religion preached by all prophets, centers on the concept of tawhid, which encompasses both the oneness and transcendence of God and humanity's duty to reflect divine harmony within the world.

Al-Faruqi also asserted that the study of religion should focus less on validating its truth through external or functional measures and more on understanding the condition of the homo religiosus—the naturally religious human being with an inherent awareness of the divine.

For al-Faruqi, meta-religious dialogue served as a vehicle for fostering mutual understanding and respect among faith communities, bridging the gaps created by doctrinal differences. His emphasis on ethics over theology was intended to support more constructive and less contentious interfaith engagements.

=== Comparative religion ===
Al-Faruqi's work in comparative religion aimed to create a framework for respectful engagement among diverse faith traditions. He explored philosophical contrasts and convergences between Islam and Christianity, especially regarding interpretations of Hebrew scripture. He emphasized that during the peak of Islamic civilization, interreligious dialogue was a public pastime and a common topic in intellectual circles, showcasing its historical precedence. His approach examined differing hermeneutical methods and theological frameworks, identifying shared values that could support interfaith dialogue while respecting doctrinal distinctions. He believed in the value of dialogue initiated based on mutual respect and ethical considerations, stating that "conversion to the truth is the aim of dialogue," reflecting his commitment to honest interfaith engagement.

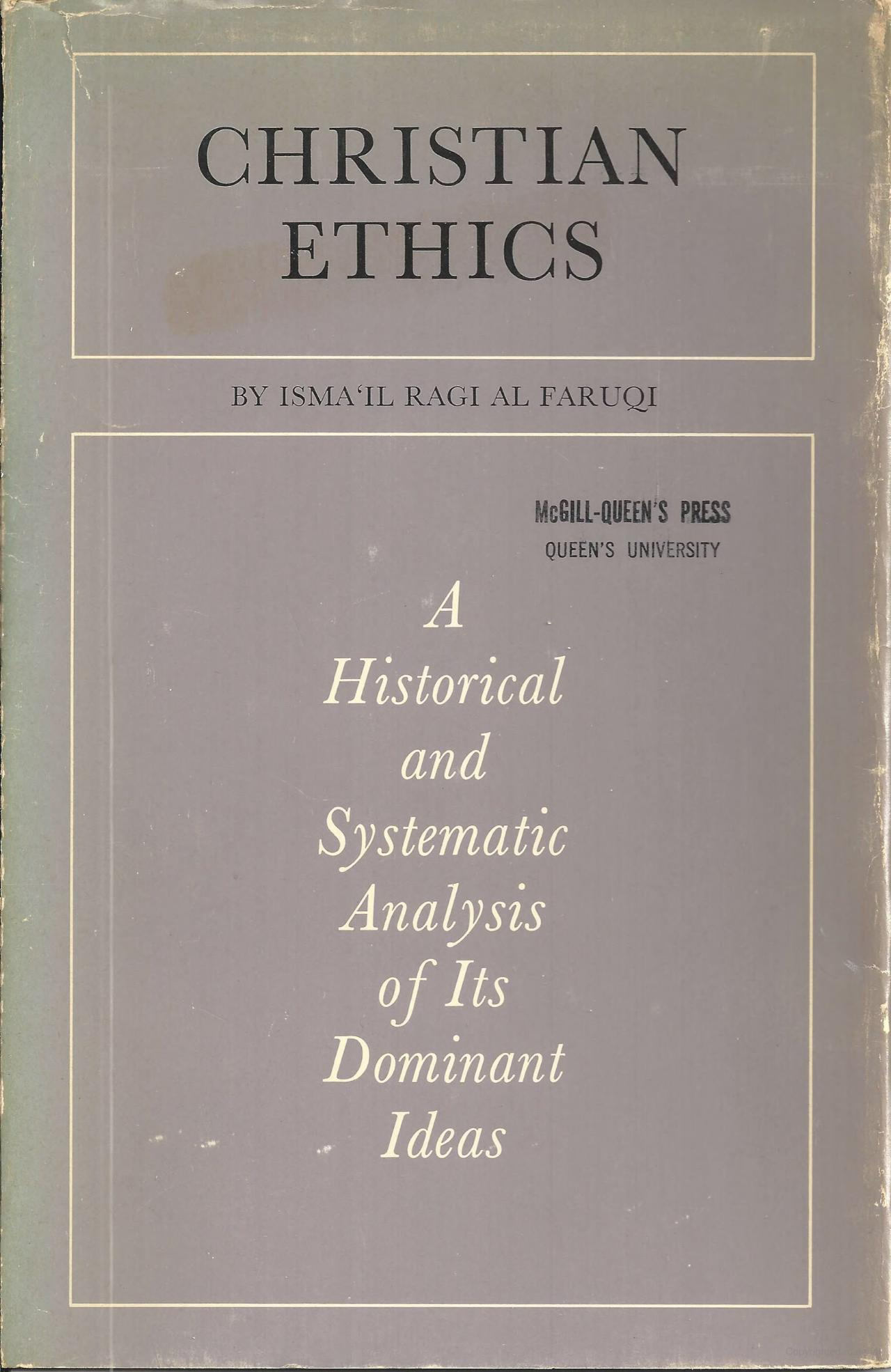
Cover of the 1967 edition of Christian Ethics

Al-Faruqi argued that, unlike Islam, Christianity lacks explicit foundations for structuring social frameworks such as law and economics, which he viewed as essential to societal cohesion:

The lack of foundation in the Christianist dogma for a sound societism perturbed the Christian mind very strongly during the last one hundred years. The growth of urban centers, of industry, of the means of communication, brought about a realization of the need for a new kind of social cohesion... But the Church, being the loyal guardian of that legacy, could answer him only in paradoxes which availed nothing... It was not that the Church could have helped but refrained—it really did its acrobatic best—but that there was no way to obvert the fact that Jesus’ message was not a societist one.

He further observed what he viewed as a fundamental internal conflict in Western ethics stemming from this dualistic legacy, stating:

Ever since he became a Christian, Western man has lived a split life and suffered from a split personality. Jesus and his ethical renunciation on the one hand, and nature with its self-assertion, nature-affirmation and ‘worldliness’ on the other, divided his loyalty and being. Although he conducted his life oblivious to Jesus’ emphasis on the spiritual over and against the material, yet he invoked Jesus’ blessing for every move.

In addition to his exploration of Christian theology, al-Faruqi engaged with contemporary Western philosophy, examining ethics through thinkers like Kant, Scheler, and Hartmann. His comparative studies also extended into ethical and metaphysical questions, where he highlighted differing value systems between Western and Islamic thought.

In examining religious traditions historically, al-Faruqi saw potential for interfaith dialogue that acknowledges shared principles alongside distinctive beliefs. Al-Faruqi argued that Western ethics often emphasize individualism, whereas Islamic ethics prioritize communal welfare and divine accountability. These contrasting frameworks, he suggested, shape each tradition's broader views on morality, existence, and purpose.

However, some critics, such as Damian Howard, argued that al-Faruqi's approach to interfaith engagement placed greater emphasis on Islamic perspectives than on fostering reciprocal understanding among faiths. They suggested that this emphasis may have limited the depth and inclusiveness of his dialogue model. Nevertheless, his contributions to comparative religion remain significant, providing a model for respectful dialogue that emphasizes both ethical integrity and intellectual rigor.

=== Islamization of knowledge ===
Al-Faruqi was instrumental in conceptualizing holistic knowledge, a framework that integrates Islamic principles with modern disciplines, an approach often described as neo-modernist. Concerned about the secularization of knowledge in Muslim societies, al-Faruqi advocated for a holistic epistemology, reinterpreting Islamic thought to address contemporary challenges. He described what he called "the malaise of the ummah," arguing that reliance on Western tools and methodologies led to a disconnection from ecological and social realities in Muslim nations, often overlooking essential Islamic ethics. Al-Faruqi emphasized the integration of Islamic values within modern knowledge systems to help preserve the ethical fabric of the Muslim community.

The later part of al-Faruqi's career concentrated on the Islamization of knowledge concept. Responding to what he saw as the secularization and Western dominance of Muslim educational systems, he envisioned an integration of Islamic values with contemporary scientific and academic disciplines, ultimately striving for an epistemology rooted in ethical integrity. This concept included economic principles such as zakat and prohibitions on usury to ensure that economic activity aligned with Islamic ethics. His ideas eventually led to the founding of IIIT, which aimed to create an Islamic epistemology and methodology applicable across disciplines.

Al-Faruqi's methodology also extended to social sciences, where he advocated frameworks that retained Islamic ethical considerations while critiquing Western secularism. His goal was to replace secular principles with a foundation built on Islamic ethics that aligned with the values of the ummah. He envisioned a unified Islamic curriculum that incorporated contemporary disciplines while firmly grounding them in Islamic thought. This approach sought to produce scholars capable of addressing modern challenges from an Islamic perspective, stressing both curriculum development and practical strategies for reforming educational systems.

Some scholars, such as Ibrahim Kalin, have critiqued al-Faruqi's focus on humanities, arguing it left the natural sciences largely unexamined. Kalin describes al-Faruqi's work as an example of how "the idea of method or methodology (manhaj and manhajiyyah)... can obscure deeper philosophical issues involved in the current discussions of science." Despite Al-Faruqi's goal to Islamize Western knowledge, Kalin asserts, his focus "was exclusively on the humanities, leaving scientific knowledge virtually untouched." This omission, Kalin argues, led to unintended consequences: "First, Faruqi's work on Islamization provided his followers with a framework in which knowledge (ilm) came to be equated with social disciplines, thus ending up in a kind of sociologism... Second, the exclusion of modern scientific knowledge from the scope of Islamization has led to negligent attitudes... toward the secularizing effect of the modern scientific worldview."

Kalin's critique suggests that al-Faruqi's limited engagement with scientific knowledge risks creating a framework overly centered on sociological interpretations of Islamic knowledge. By omitting the natural sciences, Kalin argues, al-Faruqi's approach inadvertently reinforces a secular divide between natural and human sciences that may leave modern Muslim intellectuals unequipped to address the philosophical and epistemological challenges posed by contemporary science.

=== Islamic civilization and culture ===
From Cordova to Mindanao, the arts of these lands once converted to Islam betrayed the same constitutive characteristics, avoidance of naturalism, of characterization and development; and preference for stylization, for formalism generative of movement, for limitless repetition.

— Isma'il R. al-Faruqi

Al-Faruqi viewed Islamic civilization as a comprehensive and integrated system of values, rooted in the principle of tawhid. He argued that unlike cultural relativism—which treats each culture as an autonomous entity without universal criteria for evaluation—Islamic civilization is grounded in absolute, divinely revealed values that are universally valid for all humanity. This universality distinguishes Islamic civilization from relativist perspectives, which deny any culture the ability to claim universal truth.

According to al-Faruqi, Islamic art is a primary expression of this unified worldview. Despite geographical and historical variations, Islamic art is characterized by its preference for stylization, abstraction, and the avoidance of naturalism. These aesthetic choices are rooted in the Islamic understanding of divine transcendence, which prohibits the depiction of God or living beings in a naturalistic form. Instead, Islamic art employs geometric patterns, arabesques, and Arabic calligraphy to symbolize the infinite and the divine. Al-Faruqi emphasized that this artistic unity is not merely a matter of style but is directly connected to the Islamic worldview. The calligraphic art of the Qur'an, where the divine word is transformed into a visual form, exemplifies this connection, maintaining the sacred nature of the text while expressing it artistically.

In his analysis of Islamic architecture, al-Faruqi highlighted that it is an extension of the Islamic concept of space, wherein the sacred is prioritized over the profane. The mosque, with its open, uncluttered space oriented towards the qiblah (direction of Makkah), serves as the archetype of Islamic architecture. Its simplicity and functionality reflect the unity of spiritual and material aspects of life.

Al-Faruqi rejected cultural relativism, asserting that Islamic civilization is not just one among many but a universal civilization providing a coherent, value-based framework for all aspects of life. He argued that Islamic civilization is distinguished by its capacity to integrate diverse cultures under the unifying principles of tawhid. This synthesis is evident in how Islamic civilization historically absorbed and transformed local customs, languages, and arts, creating a diverse but unified cultural heritage. This cultural synthesis, al-Faruqi maintained, was feasible because Islamic civilization is governed by a clear hierarchy of values rooted in divine revelation. At the core of this hierarchy is the concept of tawhid, ensuring the unity of all aspects of life—spiritual, ethical, social, and intellectual.

For al-Faruqi, Arabic is not merely the liturgical language of Islam but an essential component of Islamic civilization. He argued that the Qur’an's linguistic form is inseparable from its divine content, rendering Arabic a vehicle of both religious and cultural unity. This is most clearly observed in the widespread use of Arabic calligraphy in Islamic art, where aesthetic and spiritual dimensions are intertwined. Arabic calligraphy, with its varied styles—Kufic, Naskh, Thuluth, and others—became a unifying element of Islamic art across diverse regions, symbolizing the shared spiritual and cultural heritage of the Islamic world.

=== Critique of Zionism ===
Al-Faruqi was a vocal critic of Zionism, viewing it as incompatible with Judaism due to its nationalist ideology. He argued that Zionism was fundamentally unjust, as it sought to displace Palestine's indigenous population and seize their land, resources, and homes. He characterized it as "naked robbery by force of arms," accompanied by indiscriminate violence against civilians:

Its plan was to empty Palestine of its native inhabitants and to occupy their lands, farms, homes, and all movable properties. Zionism was guilty of naked robbery by force of arms; of wanton, indiscriminate slaughter of men, women, and children; of destruction of men's lives and properties.

Consequently, he maintained that Zionism's dismantling was necessary to restore justice.

Al-Faruqi envisioned an alternative path for Israeli Jews who renounced Zionism, suggesting they could live as an "ummatic community" within the Muslim world, where they could preserve their faith under Jewish law as interpreted by rabbinic courts supported within an Islamic framework. This perspective highlighted his belief that Islamic governance could accommodate diverse communities without imposing on their religious practices:

[Islam] requires the Jews to set up their own rabbinic courts and put its whole executive power at its disposal. The shari'ah, the law of Islam, demands of all Jews to submit themselves to the precepts of Jewish law as interpreted by the rabbinic courts, and treats defiance or contempt of the rabbinic court as rebellion against the Islamic state itself, on a par with like action on the part of a Muslim vis-à-vis the Islamic court.

Reflecting on Zionism's impact, al-Faruqi argued that rather than providing security for Jews, it had created a precarious existence in Israel, where life became defined by conflict and reliance on foreign powers:

Zionism has not only contributed to this sad state of affairs. It is directly responsible for it. How, then, can it be said that it had succeeded in providing security for the Jew? Even in the very heartland of Zionism, in Israel, the Jew sits in the midst of an armory, surrounding himself with barbed wire, minefields, and all kinds of weaponry to prevent an onslaught which he knows for certain is coming, sooner or later. His very existence is a regimented spartanism, due in greatest measure to the bounty of international imperialism and colonialism. Thus, Israel, the so-called greatest achievement of Zionism, is really its greatest failure. For the very being of the Zionist state rests, in final analysis, on the passing whim of international politics.

Al-Faruqi's critique of Zionism was rooted in his commitment to justice as defined within an Islamic worldview.

== Legacy and impact ==
=== Scholarly achievements ===
Al-Faruqi on Humanity and Nature
In this excerpt, Isma'il Raji al-Faruqi explains that fulfilling the terms of the khilafah (stewardship or vicegerency) includes a duty to study and transform nature, which encompasses all of creation—from within ourselves to the natural world around us.

Al-Faruqi contributed to Islamic studies through his extensive writings and active involvement in academic and interfaith organizations. He authored over 100 articles in scholarly journals and magazines and published 25 influential books, including Christian Ethics: A Historical and Systematic Analysis of Its Dominant Ideas (1968), Islam and the Problem of Israel (1980), and Al-Tawhid: Its Implications for Thought and Life (1982). These works addressed a wide range of topics, including ethics, theology, interfaith dialogue, and the integration of Islamic thought into contemporary academic disciplines.

Described as the "Martin Luther of Islam," al-Faruqi's approach to reforming Islamic intellectualism emphasized tawhid as a unifying framework for addressing ethical, political, and aesthetic questions. This foundational principle informed his work harmonizing Islamic principles with modern academic disciplines. He distinguished iman (conviction) from the Christian concept of "faith," arguing that iman is rooted in knowledge and certainty rather than subjective belief.

Al-Faruqi was among the first Muslim academics to engage with phenomenology and the history of religions as methods for understanding religious experience. He argued that these approaches allowed for a greater appreciation of Islam as part of human religious history while enabling Muslims to participate in the modern study of religion. His work helped bridge the gap between traditional Islamic thought and contemporary academic methods.

In 1973, al-Faruqi established the Islamic Studies Group in the American Academy of Religion (AAR) and chaired it for ten years. This initiative provided a formal platform for Muslim scholars to engage in dialogue with scholars from other religious traditions, particularly in comparative religion and interfaith studies. Besides his academic work, al-Faruqi held leadership positions such as vice president of the Inter-Religious Peace Colloquium and president of the American Islamic College in Chicago.

The first logo used by IIUM (initially known as IIU).

In March 1977, al-Faruqi played a significant role in the First World Conference on Muslim Education in Makkah. This conference included participants such as Mohd Kamal Hassan, Syed Muhammad Naquib al-Attas, and Syed Ali Ashraf, among others. The conference laid the groundwork for establishing Islamic universities in Dhaka, Islamabad, Kuala Lumpur, Kampala, and Niger. Al-Faruqi was instrumental in the conference's deliberations and the development of its action plans.

He also served as an adviser to political leaders in the Muslim world, including Muhammad Zia-ul-Haq in Pakistan and Mahathir Mohamad in Malaysia. During Zia-ul-Haq's administration, al-Faruqi contributed to the establishment of the International Islamic University in Islamabad in 1980, which aimed to integrate Islamic values with contemporary academic disciplines. In Malaysia, al-Faruqi advised Prime Minister Mahathir Mohamad, assisting in the foundation of the International Islamic University Malaysia (IIUM) in 1983. Both institutions were established to combine religious and secular knowledge within a holistic educational framework.

In 1980, Ismail al-Faruqi co-founded the International Institute of Islamic Thought (IIIT) with Taha Jabir Alalwani, Abdul Hamid AbuSulayman, and Anwar Ibrahim. His involvement in interfaith dialogue promoted mutual understanding and cooperation among religious communities, fostering a global environment of peace and respect that highlighted the commonalities between Islam, Christianity, and Judaism.

=== Contemporary relevance ===
Al-Faruqi's ideas on the Islamization of knowledge remain influential in contemporary Islamic thought. His work has guided the development of academic curricula at institutions like the International Islamic University Malaysia (IIUM) and the International Islamic University, Islamabad, where religious studies are integrated with modern disciplines to harmonize faith and reason. His contributions continue to shape scholarly discourse in Islamic thought and education, with his works being frequently referenced in academic conferences and publications.

His approach to interfaith dialogue focused on identifying ethical and moral commonalities among major faiths, particularly Islam, Christianity, and Judaism. Scholars have recognized his emphasis on shared values as a significant contribution to fostering mutual understanding and respect across religious communities. His framework has informed broader efforts to promote peace and cooperation globally.

Al-Faruqi's contributions also extended into practical applications. His methodologies influenced the establishment of programs, such as mandatory religious studies courses at IIUM, designed to provide a comprehensive understanding of spiritual traditions and their civilizational impact. His scholarly works, including Christian Ethics and Trialogue of Abrahamic Faiths, remain key resources in interfaith dialogue and comparative religion studies. These works continue to influence academic discussions in both Islamic and Western contexts.

His contributions have been recognized posthumously, particularly in communities like Montreal, where his scholarship and community-building efforts left a lasting impact.

== Bibliography ==
=== Dissertations ===
- The Ethics of Reason and the Ethics of Life (Kantian and Nietzschean Ethics) (Master's thesis). Bloomington: Indiana University. 1949.
- On Justifying the Good (PhD thesis). Bloomington: Indiana University. 1952.

=== Books ===
- 'Urubah and Religion: An Analysis of the Dominant Ideas of Arabism and of Islam as Its Highest Moment of Consciousness. On Arabism. Vol. 1. Amsterdam: Djambatan. 1962.
- Christian Ethics: A Systematic and Historical Analysis of Its Dominant Ideas. Montreal and Amsterdam: McGill University Press and Djambatan. 1968.
- W.T. Chan; P.T. Raju; J. Kitagawa (1969). The Great Asian Religions. New York: Macmillan.
- Historical Atlas of the Religions of the World. New York: Macmillan. 1975.
- Islam and Culture. Kuala Lumpur: ABIM. 1980.
- Islam and the Problem of Israel. London: The Islamic Council of Europe. 1980. ISBN 983954134X.
- A. O. Naseef, ed. (1981). Social and Natural Sciences. Sevenoaks, UK and Jeddah: Hodder and Stoughton and King Abdulaziz University.
- The Hijrah: The Necessity of Its Iqamat or Vergegenwartigung. Kuala Lumpur: ABIM. 1981.
- Essays in Islamic and Comparative Studies. Herndon, VA: IIIT. 1982.
- Islamic Thought and Culture. Herndon, VA: IIIT. 1982.
- Trialogue of the Abrahamic Faiths. Herndon, VA: IIIT. 1982. ISBN 0915957256.
- Islamization of Knowledge: General Principles and Work Plan. Herndon, VA: IIIT. 1982.
- Al-Tawhid: Its Implications For Thought And Life. Kuala Lumpur: IIIT. 1982.
- Divine Transcendence and Its Expression. Kuala Lumpur: ABIM. 1983.
- Islam. Beltsville, MD: Amana Publications. 1985.
- Toward Islamic English. Herndon, VA: IIIT. 1986.
- The Cultural Atlas of Islam. New York: Macmillan. 1986.
- أصول الصهيونية في الدين اليهودي (Usul al-Sahyuniyyah fi al-Din al-Yahudi) [An Analytical Study of the Growth of Particularism in Hebrew Scripture] (in Arabic). Cairo: Institute of Higher Arabic Studies. 1964.
- الملل المعاصرة في الدين اليهودي (Al-Milal al-Muasirah fi al-Din al-Yahudi) [Contemporary Sects in Judaism] (in Arabic). Cairo: Institute of Higher Arabic Studies. 1968.

=== In the press ===
- An Anthology of Readings on Tawhid. Kuwait: IIFSO.
- Training Program for Islamic Youth. Kuwait: IIFSO.
- The Life of Muhammad Ibn Abdul Wahhab. Riyadh: The Ministry of Higher Education.

=== Translated texts ===
- K.M. Khalid (1953). From Here We Start. Translated by Ismail Raji al-Faruqi. Washington, DC: American Council of Learned Societies.
- M. al Ghazali (1953). Our Beginning in Wisdom. Translated by Ismail Raji al-Faruqi. Washington, DC: American Council of Learned Societies.
- M. B. Ghali (1953). The Policy of Tomorrow. Translated by Ismail Raji al-Faruqi. Washington, DC: American Council of Learned Societies.
- Haykal, Muḥammad Ḥusayn (1976). The Life of Muhammad. Translated by Ismail Raji al-Faruqi. Indianapolis: North American Trust Publications. ISBN 9780892590025.
- Shaykh Muhammad ibn 'Abd al Wahhab (1979). Sourceworks of Islamic Thought: Three Essays on Tawhid. Translated by Ismail Raji al-Faruqi. Indianapolis: North American Trust Publications.

=== Posthumous works ===
- A.R. Siddiqui; Syed F. Ahmad, eds. (1986). The Path of Islamic Da'wah in the West. London: UK Islamic Mission. OCLC 634362296.
- Pemikiran Islam Al-Faruqi: Kumpulan Kertas Kerja Al-Faruqi [Islamic Thought of Al-Faruqi: A Collection of Al-Faruqi's Working Papers] (in Malay). Dewan Bahasa dan Pustaka. 1988. ISBN 9789836200358. OCLC 19512026.
- Ataullah Siddiqui, ed. (2007). Islam and Other Faiths. Islamic Foundation. ISBN 9780860372769.
- Imtiyaz Yusuf, ed. (2012). Islam: Religion, Practice, Culture & World Order. London: IIIT. ISBN 9781565645875.
- International Institute of Islamic Thought, ed. (2018). Isma'il Al Faruqi: Selected Essays. London, Washington: IIIT. ISBN 9781565645981.
- Imtiyaz Yusuf, ed. (2021). Essential Writings: Ismail Al Faruqi. Kuala Lumpur: IBT Books. ISBN 9789670526928.

=== Articles ===
- "On the Ethics of the Brethren of Purity and Friends of Fidelity (Ikhwan al Safa wa Khillan al Wafa)". The Muslim World. 50 (2): 109–121., "On the Ethics of the Brethren of Purity and Friends of Fidelity (Ikhwan al Safa wa Khillan al Wafa)". The Muslim World. 50 (4): 252–258., "On the Ethics of the Brethren of Purity and Friends of Fidelity (Ikhwan al Safa wa Khillan al Wafa)". The Muslim World. 51 (1): 18–24.
- Al-Faruqi, Isma'il R. (1962). "Towards a Historiography of Pre-Hijrah Islam". Islamic Studies. 1 (2): 65–87. JSTOR 20832632.
- Al-Fārūqī, Ismā'il Rāgī (1962). "Towards a New Methodology for Qur'ānic Exegesis". Islamic Studies. 1 (1): 35–52. JSTOR 20832619., "Towards a New Methodology for Qur'ānic Exegesis". Muslim Life. 11 (1): 4–18. January–March 1964.
- "On the Significance of Reinhold Niebuhr's Ideas of Society". Canadian Journal of Theology. 7 (2): 99–107., "On the Significance of Reinhold Niebuhr's Ideas of Society". Muslim Life. 11 (3): 5–14. Summer 1964.
- "A Comparison of the Islamic and Christian Approaches to Hebrew Scripture". Journal of Bible and Religions. 31 (4): 283–293.
- "Muhadarat fi Tarikh al-Adyan (محاضرات في تاريخ الأديان)" [Lectures on the History of Religions]. Bulletin of the Faculty of Arts (in Arabic). 21 (1). Cairo University Press: 65–74. May 1959.
- "On the Raison d'Etre of the Ummah". Islamic Studies. 2 (2): 159–203.
- "Nazariyat Islami Dawlat (نظریات اسلامی دولت)" [Theories of the Islamic State]. Chiragh-i-Rah (in Urdu) (Nazariyat Pakistan Number): 383–389. December 1960.; "The Nature of the Islamic State". The Voice of Islam. 9 (4): 169–177. January 1961.
- "History of Religions: Its Nature and Significance for Christian Education and the Muslim-Christian Dialogue". Numen: International Review for the History of Religions. 12 (2): 81–86., Professor Bernard E. Meland. "In Response to Dr. Faruqi". Numen. 12 (2): 87–95.
- "Al Nazzam". Encyclopedia Britannica. 11.
- "Pakistan and the Islamic Imperative". Islamic Literature (1): 1–10. 1966.
- "The Self in Mu'tazilah Thought". International Philosophical Quarterly. 101 (3): 366–388. September 1966., P.T. Raju; Albury Castell, eds. (1968). "The Self in Mu'tazilah Thought". East-West Studies on the Problem of the Self. M. Nijhoff: 87–107.
- "Science and Traditional Values in Islamic Society". Zygon: Journal of Religion and Science. 11 (3): 231–246. September 1967., W. Morehouse, ed. (1968). "Science and Traditional Values in Islamic Society". Science and the Human Condition in India and Pakistan. The Rockefeller University Press.
- "Islam and Christianity: Prospects for Dialogue". The Sacred Heart Messenger: 29–33. September 1967.
- "Islam and Christianity: Diatribe or Dialogue". Journal of Ecumenical Studies. 5 (1): 45–77. 1968.
- James P. Cotter, ed. (1976). "Islam and Christianity: Problems and Perspectives". The Word in the Third World. Washington–Cleveland: Corpus Books. pp. 159–181. ASIN B000FMMU1K.
- "The Problem of the Metaphysical Status of Values in the Western and Islamic Traditions". Studia Islamica. 28: 29–62.
- Al Faruqi, I. R. (Spring 1969). "The Ideal Social Order in the Arab World, 1800–1968". Journal of Church and State. 11 (2): 239–251. doi:10.1093/jcs/11.2.239.
- "Forward: Six Basic Economic Principles in Islam". Proceedings of the Third East Coast Regional Conference. Gary, IN: Muslim Students’ Association: 1–8. 1968.
- "The Challenge of Western Ideas for Islam". Islamic Literature: 1–6. September 1969.
- "Misconceptions of the Nature of the Work of Art in Islam". Islam and the Modern Age. 1 (1): 29–44. May 1970., "On the Nature of the Work of Art in Islam". Islam and the Modern Age. 1 (2): 68–81. August 1970.
- "Islam and Art". Studia Islamica. 37: 81–109. 1973.
- "Introduction". Proceedings of the Third National Seminar of the Association of Muslim Social Scientists. Gary, IN: Association of Muslim Social Scientists: v–ix. 1974.
- Al Faruqi, Isma'il R. (1973). "The Essence of Religious Experience in Islam". Numen. 20 (3): 186–201. doi:10.1163/156852773X00367.
- "Internal Dynamics of the Muslim Community". Al-Ittihad. 12 (3): 2–7. Summer 1975.
- "Al-Asas al-mushtarak bayna al-Islam wa al-Masihiyya (الأساس المشترك بين الإسلام والمسيحية)" [The Common Ground between Islam and Christianity]. Al 'Ilm Wa al Imam (in Arabic) (6): 64–87. 1396–1976.
- "Al-Muslimun fi Amrika (المسلمون في أمريكا)" [The Muslims in America]. Majallat Al-Buhuth Al-Islamiyyah (in Arabic). 1 (2): 590–593. 1976.
- "Islam wa al-Muslimun fi Amrika (الإسلام والمسلمون في أمريكا)" [Islam and the Muslims in America]. Al-Shabab Al-'Arabi (in Arabic): 3. November 1, 1976., "Islam wa al-Muslimun fi Amrika (الإسلام والمسلمون في أمريكا)" [Islam and the Muslims in America]. Al-Shabab Al-'Arabi (in Arabic): 34. November 8, 1976., "Islam wa al-Muslimun fi Amrika (الإسلام والمسلمون في أمريكا)" [Islam and the Muslims in America]. Al-Shabab Al-'Arabi (in Arabic): 34. November 15, 1976., "Islam wa al-Muslimun fi Amrika (الإسلام والمسلمون في أمريكا)" [Islam and the Muslims in America]. Al-Shabab Al-'Arabi (in Arabic): 11. November 22, 1976.
- "The Muslim-Christian Dialogue: A Constructionist View". Islam and the Modern Age. 8 (1): 5–36. February 1977.
- "Adapting the Qur'an!". Impact International. 7 (4): 10–11. February–March 1977.
- "Moral Values in Medicine and Science". Biosciences Communications. 3 (1). 1977.
- "Al-Ijtihad wa al-Ijma' ka-Tarafay al-Dinamikiyah fi al-Islam (الاجتهاد والإجماع كطرفي الديناميكية في الإسلام)" [Ijtihad and Ijma' as the Two Poles of Dynamism in Islam]. Al-Muslim Al-Mu'asir (in Arabic) (9): 5–18. March 1977.
- "Islam and the Social Sciences". Al-Ittihad. 14 (1–2): 38–40. January–April 1977.
- "Ab'ad al-Ibadat fi al-Islam (أبعاد العبادات في الإسلام)" [The Dimensions of Worship in Islam]. Al-Muslim Al-Mu'asir (in Arabic) (10): 25–38. 1977.
- "Central Asia Report: Muslims Survive". Impact International: 14–15. October 1977.
- Altaf Gauhar, ed. (1978). "Islam and Other Faiths". The Challenge of Islam. Islamic Council of Europe: 82–111.
- "Islam and Architecture". The Muslim Scientist. 7 (1–2): 14–22. March–June 1978.
- "Our Moral Dilemma". The Voice of Islam. 8 (5): 9–11. February 1978.
- "Uber das Wesen der Islamischen Da'wa" [On the Nature of Islamic Da'wah]. Al-lslam (in German) (2/77): 2–8.
- "Nahnu wa al-Gharb (نحن والغرب)" [We and the West]. Al-Muslim Al-Mu'asir (in Arabic) (11): 21–35. July 1977.
- "On The Nature of Islamic Da'wah". March 10, 2010. Archived from the original on June 21, 2024.
- "Commentaries on Christian Missions in the Muslim World". International Review of Mission. 65 (260): 391–400, 385–460. October 1976.
- "On the Metaphysics of Ethics in Islam". Listening: Journal of Culture and Religion. 14 (1): 25–43. Winter 1979.
- Khurshid Ahmad and Z. Ansari, ed. (1979). "Is the Muslim Definable in Terms of His Economic Pursuits?". Islamic Perspectives: Essays in Honor of A. A. Mawdudi. The Islamic Foundation: 183–193.
- "Divine Transcendence: Its Expression in Christianity and Islam". World Faiths. 107: 11–19. Spring 1979.
- "Islamic Renaissance in Contemporary Society". Al Ittihad. 15 (4): 15–23. October 1978.
- "Al-Mar'ah al-Muslimah (المرأة المسلمة)" [The Muslim Woman]. Al-Islam (in Arabic). 23 (1–2): 84–90. 1979. "Muharram–Safar 1399"
- "Islamizing the Social Sciences". Studies in Islam. 16 (2): 108–121. April 1979.
- "Islam and the Tehran Hostages". The Wall Street Journal: 24. November 28, 1979.
- Al-Faruqi, Ismail (Summer 1979). "Rights of Non-Muslims under Islam: Social and Cultural Aspects". Journal of the Institute of Muslim Minority Affairs. 1 (1): 90–102. doi:10.1080/02666957908715785.
- "Controversy over the Moon". Voice of Islam. 11 (1): 3–5. March 1980.
- "Siyaghah al-'Ulum al-Ijtima'iyah Siyaghah Islamiyah (صياغة العلوم الاجتماعية صياغة إسلامية)" [Islamizing the Social Sciences]. Al-Muslim Al-Mu'asir (in Arabic). 20: 25–41. October–December 1979.
- Islamic Council of Europe, ed. (1980). "The Islamic Faith". Jerusalem: The Key to World Peace. Longman: 77–105.
- "Stream of Ideas Flows into Social Sciences". The Times Educational Supplement. London: 39. September 5, 1980.
- Warren Lewis (ed.). "The Role of Islam in Global Interreligious Dependence". Towards a Global Congress of the World's Religions. Barrytown, NY: Unification Theological Seminary: 19–38.
- "Humanitarian and Egalitarian Aspects of Islamic Law". Arab Perspectives. 1 (6): 6–10. September 1980.
- "Islamic Ideals in North America". SIM News Bulletin. 4 (2–3): 23–26. February 1981., "Islamic Ideals in North America". SIM News Bulletin. 4 (4): 9–14.
- "Umat Islam — Cabaran-cabaran Pemikiran Kini". Diskusi. 5 (12): 2–5. December 1980.
- "Universiti Negara Membangun — Kearah Mana?". Panji Masyarakat. Malaysia: 5–9. December 1980.
- "The Living Reality of Faith". Today's World. 1 (4). New York, USA: Holy Spirit Association for the Unification of World Christianity (HSA-UWC). December 1980.
- "I'adah al-Bina' al-Islami wa al-Sultah al-Siyasiyah (إعادة البناء الإسلامي والسلطة السياسية)" [Rebuilding Islam and Political Authority]. Al-Muslim Al-Mu'asir (in Arabic). 5 (22): 37–71. April–June 1980.
- "Al-Tawhid wa al-Fann (التوحيد والفن)" [Tawhid and Art]. Al-Muslim Al-Mu'asir (in Arabic). 5 (23): 159–180. July–September 1980., "Al-Tawhid wa al-Fann (التوحيد والفن)" [Tawhid and Art]. Al-Muslim Al-Mu'asir (in Arabic). 5 (24): 183–196. October–December 1980., "Al-Tawhid wa al-Fann (التوحيد والفن)" [Tawhid and Art]. Al-Muslim Al-Mu'asir (in Arabic). 7 (25): 137–163. January–March 1981.
- "Islam and Labour". Islam and a New International Economic Order. Geneva: International Institute for Labour Studies: 79–101. 1980.
- "Hak Bukan Islam Dalam Islam" [The Rights of Non-Muslims in Islam]. Diskusi (in Malay). 5 (7/1980): 2–5, 48. July–August 1980., "Hak Bukan Islam Dalam Islam" [The Rights of Non-Muslims in Islam]. Diskusi (in Malay). 5 (8/1980): 8–12. August–September 1980., "Hak Bukan Islam Dalam Islam" [The Rights of Non-Muslims in Islam]. Diskusi (in Malay). 5 (9/1980): 15–18, 51. September–October 1980.
- M.A.J. Beg, ed. (1981). "Islam and Architecture". Fine Arts in Islamic Civilization. Kuala Lumpur: The University of Malaya Press. pp. 99–117.
- "What Is a Muslim?". Al-Nahdah. 1 (1): 4–6. March 1981.
- "Kuzey Amerika'da Islami idealler" [Islamic Ideals in North America]. Yenidevir (in Turkish). Istanbul: 6. April 29, 1981.
- al-Faruqi, Isma’il R.; Naseef, Abdullah O., eds. (1981). "The Ummah and Its Civilizational Christ". Social and Natural Sciences. Sevenoaks, UK: Hodder and Stoughton. pp. 100–115.
- "Islamizing the Social Sciences". Islamika. Kuala Lumpur (Malaysia): Sarjana Enterprise: 1–8. 1981.
- "Can a Muslim Be Rich?". The Muslim Reader. 2 (3): 2, 11. December 1980.
- "Huquq Ghayr al-Muslimin fi al-Dawlah al-Islamiyah (حقوق غير المسلمين في الدولة الإسلامية)" [The Rights of Non-Muslims in the Islamic State]. Al-Muslim Al-Mu'asir (in Arabic). 7 (26): 19–40. April–June 1981.
- "Jawhar al-Hadarah al-Islamiyah (جوهر الحضارة الإسلامية)" [The Essence of Islamic Civilization]. Al-Muslim Al-Mu'asir (in Arabic). 7 (27): 9–28. July–September 1981.
- "Why Is the Muslim a Muslim?". Al Nahdah. 1 (2): 5–7. April–June 1981.
- "Islam in North America". Al Risalah. 6 (2): 28–37. 1981.
- "Al-Nahdah al-Islamiyah fi al-Mujtama' al-Mu'asir (النهضة الإسلامية في المجتمع المعاصر)" [The Islamic Renaissance in Contemporary Society]. Al-Muslim Al-Mu'asir (in Arabic). 7 (28): 51–67. October–December 1981.
- "Since When Is Anyone a Muslim?". Al Nahdah. 1 (3): 4–6. July–August 1981.
- "Moments of the Muslim's Religious Life". Al Nahdah. 1 (4): 5–6. October–December 1981.
- "Islam as Culture and Civilization". Islam and Contemporary Society. London and New York: Longman and the Islamic Council of Europe: 140–176. 1982.
- "Jawhar al-Hadarah al-Islamiyah (جوهر الحضارة الإسلامية)" [The Essence of Islamic Civilization]. Al-Islam Wa Al-Hadarah (in Arabic). 2. Riyadh: Al-Nadwah al-‘Alamiyah li al-Shabab al-Islami: 583–668. 1979.
- "Intention and Works in Islam". Al Fikr al Islami. 3. Algiers: Ministry of Religious Affairs: 135–164. 1976.
- "Al-Ab'ad al-Ruhiyah, wa al-Siyasiyah, wa al-Iqtisadiyah, wa al-Ijtima'iyah li al-'Ibadat, wa Ahamiyatuha li Kullin min al-Ummah wa al-Fard (الأبعاد الروحية والسياسية والاقتصادية والاجتماعية للعبادات، وأهميتها لكل من الأمة والفرد)" [The Spiritual, Political, Economic, and Social Dimensions of Worship, and Its Importance to Both the Community and the Individual]. Al-Fikr Al-Islami (in Arabic). 4. Algiers: Ministry of Religious Affairs: 9–24, 71–158. 1976.
- "How the U. S. and Islam Can Work Together". Arabia (10): 36. June 1982.
- "Siyam (Fasting)". Al Nahdah. 2 (2): 6–7. April–June 1982.
- "Salat (Worship)". Al Nahdah. 2 (1): 6–7. January–March 1982.
- "On the Nature of Islamic Da'wah". The Muslim: 1–4. October 1981.
- Henry O. Thompson, ed. (1982). "Divine Transcendence and Its Expression". The Global Congress of the World's Religions, Proceedings 1980–1982. New York: The Rose of Sharon Press: 267–316.
- "Hisab ma'a al-Jami'iyin (حساب مع الجامعيين)" [Reckoning with the University Students]. Al-Muslim Al-Mu'asir (in Arabic). 8 (31): 47–57. May–July 1982.
- "Freedom of Non-Muslims in an Islamic State". The Muslim Reader. 4 (2): 32–35. July 1982. "Published in Ramadan 1402"
- "Hicret'in Ihyasi ve Zamanimizda Yeniden Ikamesinin Luzumu" [Reviving the Hijrah and the Necessity of Its Reinstitution in Our Time]. Milli Gazette (in Turkish). October 13, 1982. "Published serially from October 13, 1982 to December 1, 1982 (12/26/1402 – 1/15/1403 Hijri)"
- Karim B. Akhtar and Ahmad H. Sakr, ed. (1982). "Islamic 'Fundamentalism' and the U.S.A.". Islamic Fundamentalism. Cedar Rapids, IA: Igram Press: 122–125.
- Graciela de la Lama, ed. (1982). "Islam and Other Faiths". 30th International Congress of Human Sciences in Asia and North Africa, Middle East 1. Mexico City: El Colegio de Mexico: 153–179.
- "The Nation State and Social Order in the Perspective of Islam". Trialogue of the Abrahamic Faiths. Herndon, VA: HIT: 47–59. 1982.
- "Aslimah al-Ma'rifah (أسلمة المعرفة)" [Islamization of Knowledge]. Al-Muslim Al-Mu'asir (in Arabic). 8 (32): 9–23. August–October 1982.
- "Islam and the Theory of Nature". The Islamic Quarterly. 26 (1): 16–26. 1982.
- "The Objective of the Seminar". Knowledge for What? (Proceedings of the Seminar of Islamization of Knowledge, Rabi' al Awwal 1402 / January 1982). Islamabad: Institute of Education: ix–xii. 1982.
- Waugh, Earle H.; Abu-Laban, Baha; Qureshi, Regula B., eds. (1983). "Islamic Ideals in North America". The Muslim Community in North America. Edmonton: The University of Alberta Press. pp. 359–370.
- "Report of the Seminar". Knowledge for What? (Proceedings of the Seminar of Islamization of Knowledge, Rabi' al Awwal 1402 / January 1982). Islamabad: Institute of Education: xxii–xxvi. 1982.
- "Islamization of Knowledge: The General Principles and the Work-plan". Knowledge for What? (Proceedings of the Seminar of Islamization of Knowledge, Rabi' al Awwal 1402 / January 1982). Islamabad: Institute of Education: 1–49. 1982.
- "Nahwa Jami'ah Islamiyah (نحو جامعة إسلامية)" [Toward an Islamic University]. Al-Muslim Al-Mu'asir (in Arabic). 9 (33): 47–56. November 1982. "Published from November 1982 to January 1983"
- "Islamization of Knowledge: The General Principles and the Work Plan". Pakistan Journal of History and Culture. 3 (1): 21–69. January–June 1982.
- "Islamic Message and Islamic Vision: A Challenge for Muslims in America". The Orange Crescent. 9 (4): 1–3. April 1983.
- "Al-Islam wa Farm al-'Amarah (الإسلام وفن العمارة)" [Islam and the Art of Architecture]. Al-Muslim Al-Mu'asir (in Arabic). 9 (34): 87–99. February–April 1983.

== See also ==
- Lois Lamya al-Faruqi
- Islamization of knowledge
