= Muharram =

First month of the Islamic calendar

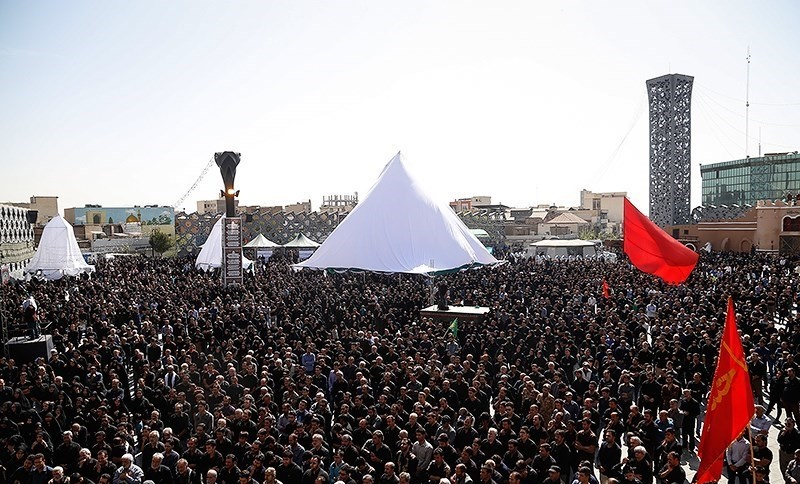
- Ashura procession in Iran
- Native name: ٱلْمُحَرَّم (Arabic)
- Calendar: Islamic calendar
- Month number: 1
- Number of days: 29–30 (depends on actual observation of the moon's crescent)
- Significant days: Ashura

Muharram (Note: Historically also spelled Muharrem, via Ottoman Turkish.) (Arabic: ٱلْمُحَرَّم, romanized: al-Muḥarram) is the first month of the Islamic calendar and one of the four sacred months in Islam. The name Muharram means “forbidden” or “sacred,” referring to the prohibition of warfare during the sacred months. Muharram is particularly significant in Shia Islam because it commemorates the Battle of Karbala in 680 CE, during which Husayn, the grandson of the Islamic prophet Muhammad and the third Shia Imam, was brutally killed along with many members of his family and companions by the Umayyad caliph Yazid. The battle took place on 10 Muharram, known as Ashura, and became one of the defining events in religious memory. For Shia Muslims, the first ten days of Muharram are a period of mourning and remembrance for Husayn and the other martyrs of Karbala.

Religious gatherings are held in mosques, husayniyyas, and other communal spaces, where scholars and maddahs recount the events of Karbala and discuss themes such as justice, sacrifice, resistance to oppression, and loyalty to the family of Muhammad. The tenth day, Ashura, is marked by particularly solemn ceremonies. Husayn's suffering and martyrdom became a symbol of sacrifice in the struggle for right against wrong, and for justice and truth against injustice and falsehood. He is a universal, borderless, interfaith and meta-religion symbol. Husayn and his companions are widely regarded as martyrs by all Muslims.

Among the practices associated with Muharram are mourning processions, recitation of elegies and lamentations, charitable distribution of food and water, and the recitation of accounts of the Battle of Karbala. The Shias practice ritual chest-beating (latmiyya or sīnah-zanī) as an expression of mourning. Muharram is also observed by Sunni Muslims, although its religious significance differs from that in Shia Islam. For Sunni Muslims, the day commemorates the parting of the Red Sea by Moses and the salvation of the Israelites, observed through voluntary fasting and other permissible expressions of gratitude. Sunnis additionally regard the killing of Husayn as a tragic event in Islamic history and commemorate it through sermons, remembrance, or other forms of reflection. Also in Muharram, the Al- Aqsa Mosque in Jerusalem was initially set as the direction of prayer (qibla) for early Muslims.

== Origins ==
Muharram (lit. 'sacred') is the first month of the Islamic calendar, with (at most) thirty days. Warfare in Muharram is forbidden, and it has been so since before the advent of Islam. The word Muharram is short for "Muharram Safar" (lit. 'sacred Safar'), which distinguishes in the ancient Arab calendar between Safar I, which was sacred, and Safar II, which was not. Over time, however, the adjective Muharram itself became the name of the first month of the year.

== Ashura ==
The tenth of Muharram is known as Ashura, an important day of commemoration in Islam. For Sunni Muslims, Ashura marks the parting of the Red Sea by Moses and the salvation of the Israelites. Also on this day, Noah disembarked from the Ark, God forgave Adam, and Joseph was released from prison, among various auspicious events on Ashura in Sunni tradition. Ashura is celebrated in Sunni Islam through supererogatory fasting, and also other pious acts and acceptable expressions of joy. In some Sunni communities, the annual Ashura festivities include carnivals, bonfires, and special dishes, even though some Sunni scholars have criticized such practices.

By contrast, for Shia Muslims, Ashura is a day of mourning as they commemorate the martyrdom of Husayn ibn Ali, grandson of the Islamic prophet Muhammad and the third Shia imam. Husayn refused on moral grounds to pledge his allegiance to the Umayyad caliph Yazid ibn Mu'awiya (r. 680–683) and was subsequently killed, alongside most of his male relatives and his small retinue, by the Umayyad army in the Battle of Karbala on Ashura 61 AH (680 CE). Among the Shia, mourning for Husayn is viewed as an act of protest against oppression, and as such a struggle for God (jihad). Mourners also hope to secure the intercession of Husayn in the afterlife. Ashura is observed annually through mourning gatherings, processions, and reenactments.

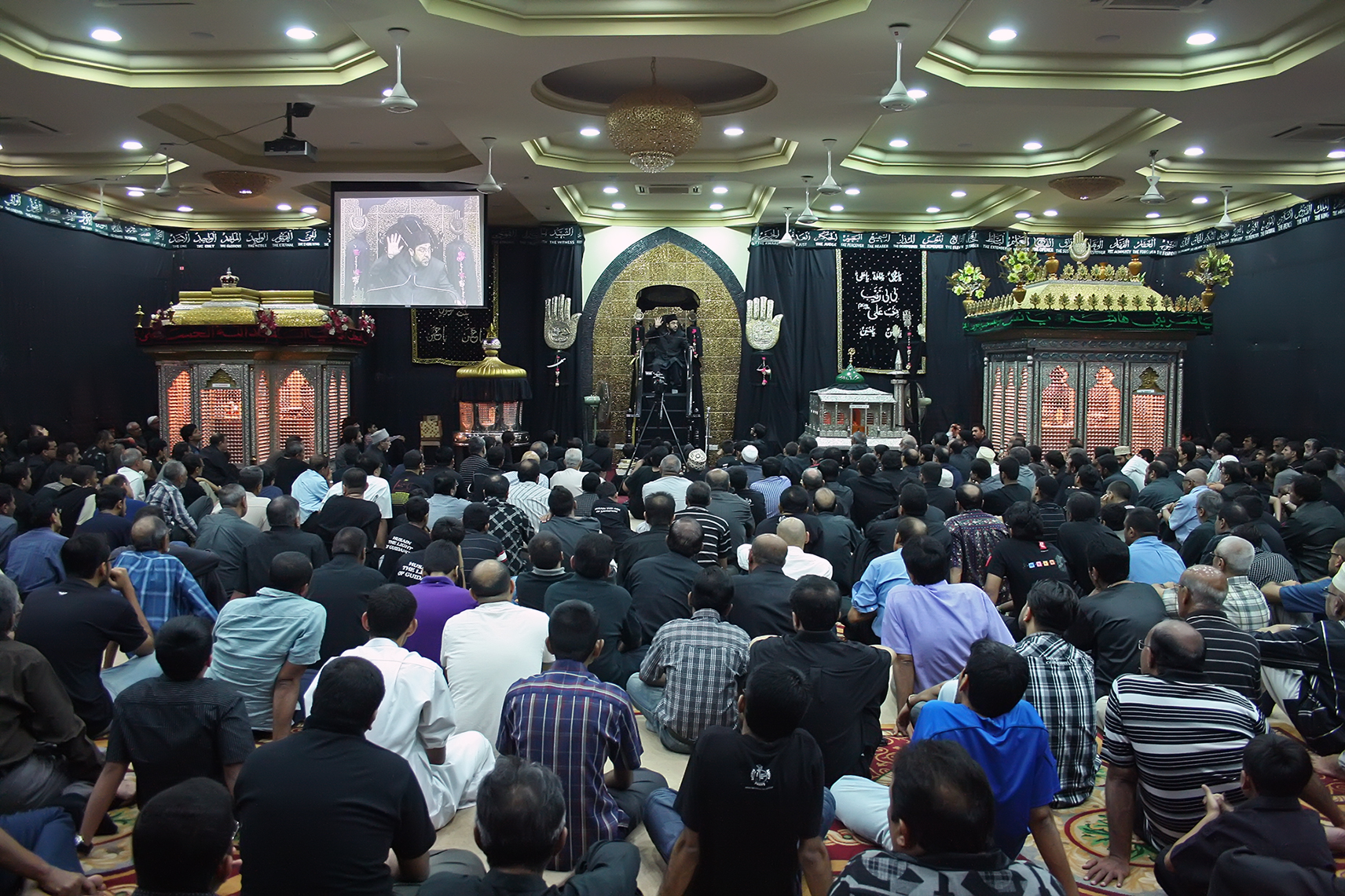
Muharram mourning gathering in Tanzania

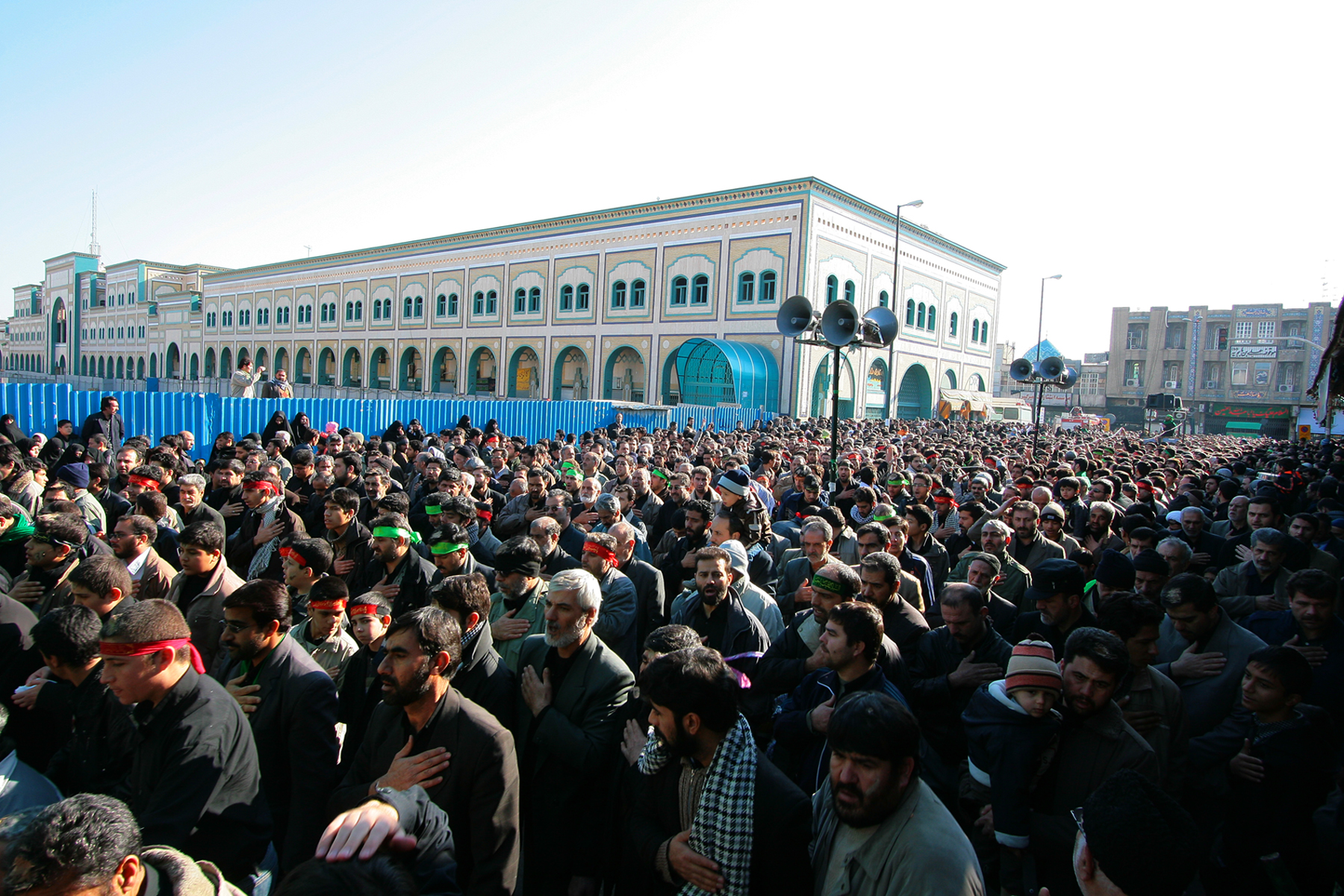
Muharram mourning procession in Iran

== Timing ==
Conversion of Hijri years 1343 to 1500 to the Gregorian calendar, with first days of al-Muharram (brown), Ramadan (grey) and Shawwal (black) bolded, and Eid al-Adha dotted – in the SVG file, hover over a spot to show its dates and a line to show the month

The Islamic calendar is lunar, and months begin when the first crescent (hilal) of a new moon is sighted. Since the lunar year (of twelve lunar months) is eleven or twelve days shorter than the solar year. Muharram days are different in consecutive solar years.

Muharram dates between 2024 and 2028
Islamic calendar	First day (CE)	Last day (CE)
1446	7 July 2024	4 August 2024
1447	26 June 2025	25 July 2025
1448	16 June 2026	16 July 2026
1449	6 June 2027	4 July 2027
1450	25 May 2028	23 June 2028

== Battle of Karbala ==
- 2 Muharram: Arrival of Husayn ibn Ali in Karbala, Iraq, in 680. On their way to the nearby Kufa, Husayn and his small caravan were intercepted by the Umayyad army and eventually forced to camp in the desert lands of Karbala, away from water and fortifications.
- 7 Muharram: The Umayyad army cut off Husayn's access to the drinking water of the nearby Euphrates river. Under the siege, Husayn's camp suffered from thirst and hunger in the coming days.
- 9 Muharram (Tasu'a): Negotiations between Husayn and the Umayyads failed on this day in 680. The Umayyad commander Umar ibn Sa'd (d. 686) was set to attack after the afternoon prayer on Tasu'a but was persuaded to delay the confrontation until the following day. Husayn and his men spent the night in prayer.
- 10 Muharram (Ashura): The Battle of Karbala was fought on this day in 680. Husayn and most of his male relatives and his small retinue were slaughtered by the Umayyad army by the end of the day. After the battle, the women and children in Husayn's camp were taken prisoner and marched to the Umayyad capital Damascus in Syria.

== Other Islamic events ==
- 1 Muharram: Death of Caliph Umar (r. 634–644) by injuries from the attack of Persian slave Abu Lu'lu'a Firuz. Sunnis carry rallies on 1 Muharram to commemorate Umar.
- 2–10 Muharram: Most mourning rituals for Karbala take place during the first ten days of Muharram, culminating on the tenth with processions in major Shia cities.
- 5 Muharram: Baba Farid, a Punjabi Sufi saint, died on this day in 1266. His death is celebrated (urs) for six days during Muharram, in Pakpattan, Pakistan.
- 8 Muharram: In what became known as the 1782 Muharram Rebellion, on this day Bengali Muslims in Sylhet staged one of the earliest anti-British uprisings in the Indian subcontinent.
- 16 Muharram: On this day, the Islamic prophet Muhammad set the Aqsa mosque in Jerusalem as the qibla, towards which early Muslims prayed. This was superseded later by the ancient Ka'ba sanctuary in Mecca in connection with verse 2:144 of the Quran, the central religious text in Islam.
- 17 Muharram: Arrival of the "people of the elephant" in Mecca, a reference to al-Fil (lit. 'the elephant'), a surah (chapter) in the Quran.

== See also ==
- Solar Hijri Calendar – Official calendar of Iran
- Tasu'a – Shia holiday
- Mourning of Muharram – Set of rituals in Shia Islam
- Farvardin – First month of the Solar Hijri calendar

== Sources ==
- Aghaie, K.S. (2013). "'Āshūrā' (Shī'ism)". In Fleet, K.; Krämer, G.; Matringe, D.; Nawas, J.; Stewart, D.J. (eds.). Encyclopaedia of Islam (Third ed.). doi:10.1163/1573-3912_ei3_COM_23855. ISBN 9789004252684.
- Ayoub, M.M. (1978). Redemptive Suffering in Islam: A Study of the Devotional Aspects of Ashura in Twelver Shi'ism. De Gruyter. ISBN 9789027979438.
- Bahramian, A.; Bulookbashi, A.A. (2015). "Al-'Abbās b. 'Alī". In Madelung, W.; Daftary, F. (eds.). Encyclopaedia Islamica. Translated by Negahban, F. doi:10.1163/1875-9831_isla_COM_0009.
- Bakhsh, Khwaja Muhammad Tahir (2008). Jalwa Gah-e-Dost (in Urdu) (2nd ed.). Archived from the original on 7 October 2011.
- Beverley, J.A. (2011). "Ashura". In Gordon Melton, J. (ed.). Religious Celebrations: An Encyclopedia of Holidays, Festivals, Solemn Observances, and Spiritual Commemorations. ABC-CLIO. pp. 47–49. ISBN 9781598842050.
- Blank, J. (2001). Mullahs on the Mainframe: Islam and Modernity Among the Daudi Bohras. University of Chicago Press. ISBN 9780226056760.
- Calmard, J. (1987). "'Azādārī". Encyclopaedia Iranica. Vol. III/2. pp. 174–177.
- Calmard, J. (2004). "Ḥosayn b. 'Ali ii. In Popular Shi'ism". Encyclopaedia Iranica. Vol. XII/5. pp. 498–502.
  - "ASWJ rallies in many towns to observe Yaum-i-Umar Farooq". Dawn. 27 October 2014.
- Gent, R.H. van (n.d.). "The Umm al-Qura Calendar of Saudi Arabia". webspace.science.uu.nl.
- Hamdar, A. (2009). "Jihad of words: Gender and contemporary Karbala Narratives". The Yearbook of English Studies. 39 (1–2): 84–100. doi:10.1353/yes.2009.0016. S2CID 158479476.
- Katz, M.H. (2007). The Birth of the Prophet Muḥammad: Devotional Piety in Sunni Islam. Routledge. ISBN 9780203962145.
- Madelung, W. (2004). "Ḥosayn b. 'Ali i. Life and Significance in Shi'ism". Encyclopaedia Iranica. Vol. XII/5. pp. 493–498.
- Islam, Emad Ullah Shahidul (19 October 2016). আরেক শহীদ দিবস [Another Martyrs' Day]. Bangladesh Pratidin (in Bengali).
  - Litvak, Meir (2021). Know Thy Enemy: Evolving Attitudes Towards "Others" in Modern Shiʿi Thought and Practice. Brill. ISBN 9789004444683.
- Momen, M. (1985). An Introduction to Shi'i Islam. Yale University Press. ISBN 9780300035315.
- Munson, H. (1988). Islam and Revolution in the Middle East. Yale University Press. ISBN 0300046049.
- Nakash, Y. (1993). "An Attempt to Trace the Origin of the Rituals of 'Āshūrā'". Die Welt des Islams: 161–181. JSTOR 1570949.
- Newman, A.J. (24 August 2024). "'Āshūrā'". Encyclopedia Britannica.
- Osman, R. (2014). Female Personalities in the Qur'an and Sunna: Examining the Major Sources of Imami Shi'i Islam. Routledge. ISBN 9781315770147.
- Nizami, Khaliq Ahmad (1955). The Life and Times of Shaikh Farid-u'd-din Ganj-i-Shakar. Department of History, Aligarh Muslim University.
- Pinault, D. (2000). "Zaynab bin 'Ali and the Place of the Women of the Households of the First Imāms in Shī'īte Devotional Literature". In Hambly, G. (ed.). Women in the Medieval Islamic World: Power, Patronage, and Piety. Macmillan. ISBN 9780333800355.
- Plessner, M. (2012). "al-Muḥarram". In Bearman, P.; Bianquis, Th.; Bosworth, C.E.; van Donzel, E.; Heinrichs, W.P. (eds.). Encyclopaedia of Islam (Second ed.). doi:10.1163/1573-3912_islam_SIM_5426. ISBN 9789004161214.
- Qutbuddin, T. (2019). "Orations of Zaynab and Umm Kulthūm in the aftermath of Ḥusayn's Martyrdom at Karbala: Speaking Truth to Power". In Korangy, A.; Rouhi, L. (eds.). The "Other" Martyrs: Women and the Poetics of Sexuality, Sacrifice, and Death in World Literatures (First ed.). Harrassowitz Verlag. pp. 103–132. doi:10.2307/j.ctvrnfq6q. ISBN 9783447198790.
- Reid, M.H. (2011). "'Āshūrā' (Sunnism)". In Fleet, K.; Krämer, G.; Matringe, D.; Nawas, J.; Stewart, D.J. (eds.). Encyclopaedia of Islam (Third ed.). doi:10.1163/1573-3912_ei3_COM_23081. ISBN 9789004203532.
- Riaz, Ali (23 July 2013). Islam and Identity Politics Among British-Bangladeshis: A Leap of Faith. Manchester University. ISBN 978-0719089558.
- Seidelmann, P. Kenneth, ed. (1992). Explanatory Supplement to the Astronomical Almanac.
- Sindawi, K. (2002). "The Image of Ḥusayn ibn 'Alī in Maqātil Literature" (PDF). Quaderni di Studi Arabi. 20/21: 79–104. JSTOR 25802958.
- Veccia Vaglieri, L. (2012). "(al-)Ḥusayn b. 'Alī b. Abī Ṭālib". In Bearman, P.; Bianquis, Th.; Bosworth, C.E.; van Donzel, E.; Heinrichs, W.P. (eds.). Encyclopaedia of Islam (Second ed.). doi:10.1163/1573-3912_islam_COM_0304. ISBN 9789004161214.
- Wensinck, A.J.; Jomier, J. (2012). "Ka'ba". In Bearman, P.; Bianquis, Th.; Bosworth, C.E.; van Donzel, E.; Heinrichs, W.P. (eds.). Encyclopaedia of Islam (Second ed.). doi:10.1163/1573-3912_islam_COM_0401. ISBN 9789004161214.
- Wensinck, A.J.; Marçais, Ph. (2012). "'Ās̲h̲ūrā'". In Bearman, P.; Bianquis, Th.; Bosworth, C.E.; van Donzel, E.; Heinrichs, W.P. (eds.). Encyclopaedia of Islam (Second ed.). doi:10.1163/1573-3912_islam_COM_0068. ISBN 9789004161214.
