= International Islamic University =

Islamic public university in Islamabad, Pakistan

International Islamic University Islamabad
- الجامعة الإسلامية العالمية
- Other name: IIUI
- Motto: وفوق كل ذي علم عليم
- Motto in English: "All those endowed with knowledge have the All-Knowing above them"
- Type: Public
- Established: 1980
- Accreditation: Higher Education Commission (Pakistan); Pakistan Engineering Council; Pakistan Bar Council
- Chancellor: The President of Pakistan
- Vice-president: Prof. Dr. Ahmed Shuja Syed
- Rector: Prof. Dr. Mukhtar Ahmed
- Academic staff: 2000 to 2,500
- Administrative staff: 1,000 to 1,300
- Students: 28,000 to 30,000
- Undergraduates: 16,000 to 18,000
- Postgraduates: 10,000 to 12,000
- Doctoral students: 400 to 500
- Location: Islamabad, Pakistan; 33°39′24.23″N 73°1′29.14″E
- Campus: Urban, 285 ha
- Colors: Green
- Website: iiu.edu.pk

The International Islamic University, Islamabad (IIUI) (Note: Arabic: الجامعة الإسلامية العالمية, romanized: al-Jāmʿia al-ʾIslāmiyya al-ʾĀlamiyya; Urdu: بین الاقوامی اسلامى يونيورسٹی, romanized: Bayn ul-Qawāmī Islāmī Ūnīwarsiṭī) is a public research university located in Islamabad, Pakistan. It is one of the world's most prestigious universities for Islamic learning and is considered as one of the three major Islamic universities in the Muslim world alongside the Al-Azhar University in Egypt and the Islamic University of Medina in Saudi Arabia.

The International Islamic University Islamabad has consistently maintained the largest international student body in Pakistan, enrolling thousands of students from more than 50 countries. The university's core focus is on Islamic law, Islamic jurisprudence and theology. The university offers undergraduate and postgraduate degrees, including doctoral and professional degrees. The degrees offered in other disciplines include Engineering, Computer Science, Natural Sciences, Business Studies, Humanities, Architecture and Law. All of its engineering programmes are accredited under the prestigious Washington Accord (credentials) as well as by the Pakistan Engineering Council.

Times Higher Education has consistently ranked the university first in Pakistan for International Outlook. According to the 2026 QS World University Rankings IIUI has reached the global 101–150 band for Theology, Divinity, and Religious Studies. The university was ranked joint second among Pakistani institutions in the 2022 rankings of Times Higher Education World University Rankings and has been since recognized among the country's leading universities in Engineering, Computer Science, and Business.

== History ==
The Islamic University was established in Islamabad on 11 November 1980, which corresponded to 1 Muharram 1401 AH, the first day of the 15h-century in the Islamic calendar. This date was chosen to symbolize the beginning of an Islamic renaissance in the modern era. It was reconstituted as the 'International Islamic University' with the promulgation of the International Islamic University Ordinance by President Muhammad Zia-ul-Haq in March 1985.

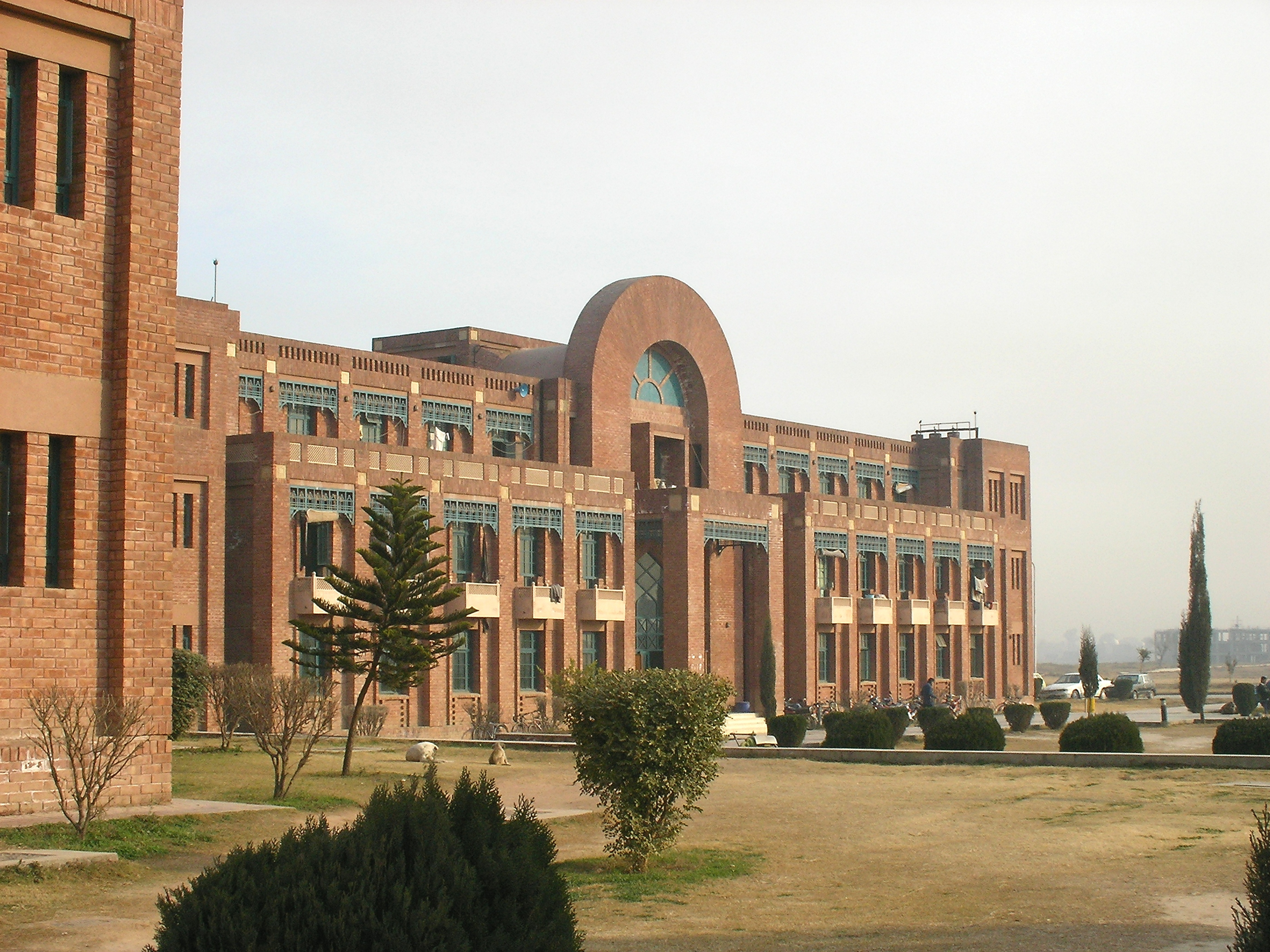
New student accommodation

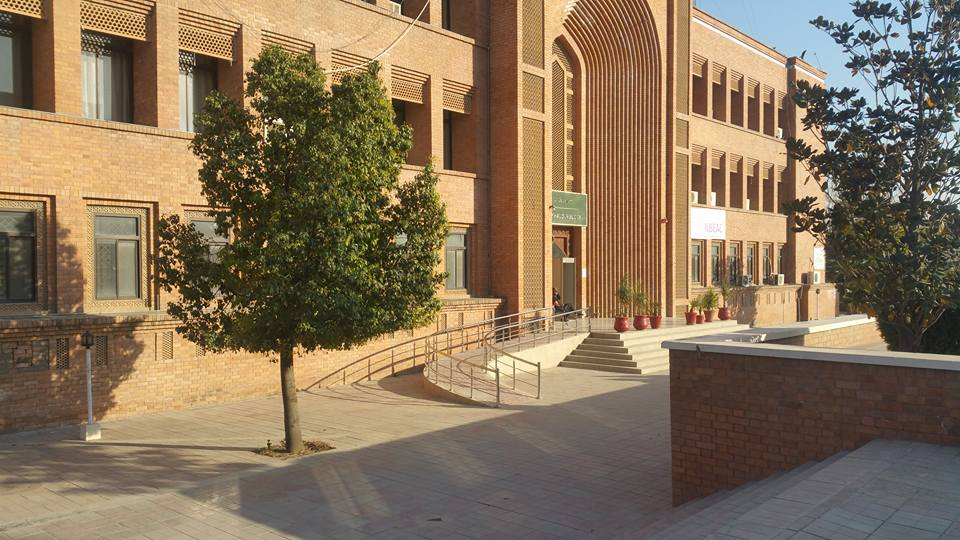

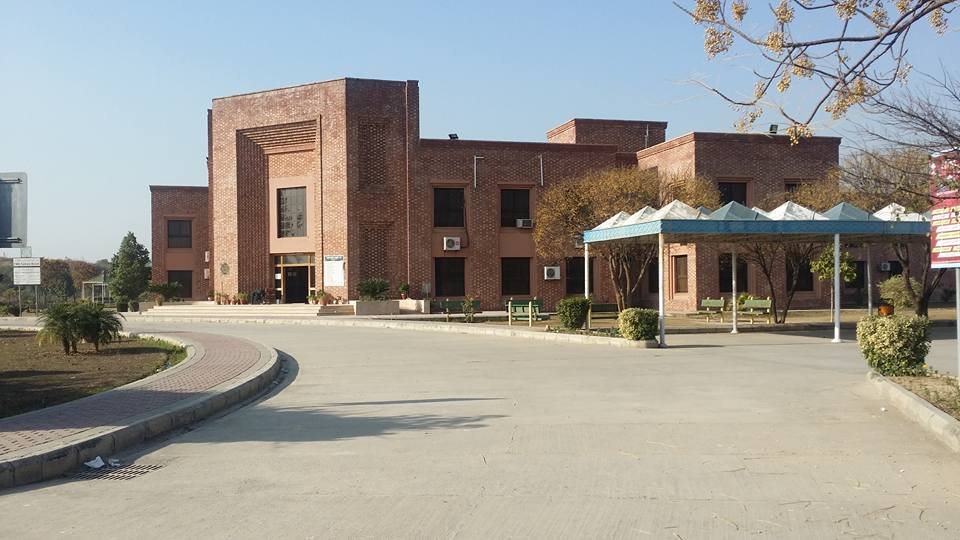
IIUI female block

The university has two campuses.

=== Old campus ===
The old campus lies about the Faisal Mosque. The mosque was designed by Vedat Dalokay, a Turkish architect. It was donated to the university by King Faisal of Saudi Arabia. The mosque is one of the largest in the world and is able to accommodate tens of thousands of people in its prayer hall, women's gallery and courtyard.

=== New campus ===
The new campus occupies Islamabad's Sector H-10. The first phase of construction of the new campus was completed in 2013. Since then a campus area for women has been established. In 2006, the construction of the Central Library and the Lincoln Corner was completed.

== Overview ==
The university is a center of learning for Islam, theology and the Islamic studies in a contemporary context.

The university was founded in 1980 with funding from inside Pakistan and foreign donations from Saudi Arabia. Ismail al-Faruqi, a prominent scholar, played a significant role in its establishment. His advisory role was instrumental in laying the foundation of the university, integrating Islamic values with contemporary academic disciplines. The main goal of university was to provide education and training in Islamic law for the people in professions of judicial officers, public prosecutors, teachers of madrassas, and preachers of Friday sermons.

In February 2014, it awarded King Abdullah of Saudi Arabia an honorary doctorate in politics and international relations. The University now offers undergraduate and post-graduate programs in law, science, engineering & technology, humanities, arts, religious studies, social and natural sciences.

== Faculties ==
The university consists of the following faculties:

=== Faculty of Computing ===
The Faculty of Computing (founded in 2020) teaches computer science and software engineering

=== Faculty of Arabic ===
The Faculty of Arabic teaches Arabic Language, literature, Linguistics, Translation and Interpretation.

=== Faculty of Sciences ===
The Faculty of Sciences (founded in 2003) teaches physics and nanotechnology, Mathematics and Statistics, environmental sciences, biotechnology and bioinformatics.

=== Faculty of Engineering and Technology ===
The Faculty of Engineering and Technology (founded in 2007) offers degrees in Computer Engineering, Mechanical Engineering, Electrical Engineering and Civil Engineering. The faculty is highly qualified with high ratio of Professors and Assistant Professors. All of its engineering programmes are accredited under the prestigious Washington Accord (credentials) as well as by the Pakistan Engineering Council.

=== Iqra College of Technology ===
The Iqra College of Technology (ICT) is a constituent college of IIUI. It offers B.Tech (Hons) and Diploma of Associate Engineering (DAE) programs. It has faculty duly recognized by PEC

=== Faculty of Languages and Literature ===
The faculty of languages and literature offers BS, MS and PhD degrees in English, Persian and Urdu.

University rankings

Global – Overall
- QS World: 1201-1400
- QS Employability: 7.3
- THE World: 600–800

Regional – Overall
- QS Asia: 301-350
- THE Asia: 150-200

National – Overall
- HEC National: 05

=== Faculty of Management Sciences ===
The faculty of management sciences was founded in 1995. In 1996, the Department of Business Administration offered Master of Business Administration program. The Department of Technology Management was founded in 1998. It is the largest faculty of the university with around 3,700 registered students.

=== Faculty of Shariah and Law ===
The Faculty of Shariah and Law was first established in Quaid-i-Azam University in 1979. In 1980, it was incorporated into International Islamic University, Islamabad. Students enrolling in doctorate programs complete one year of compulsory coursework before commencing a thesis. More than 900 students have graduated from this faculty.

=== Faculty of Social Sciences ===
The Faculty of Social Sciences offers degrees in Anthropology, Politics and International Relations, Psychology, History and Pakistan Studies, Islamic Art and Architecture, Mass Communications and Sociology.

=== Faculty of Islamic Studies ===
A Faculty of Islamic Studies (Usuluddin) was founded in 1981. It offers degrees in the Tafseer and Quranic sciences, Hadith, comparative religion, Da'wah and Islamic culture, Aqeedah and philosophy and Seerah and Islamic history. The Da'wah Academy was founded in March 1985. The Shari'ah Institute of Training was founded in 1981 and became an academy in 1985.

Faculty of Usuluddin have different international faculty members such as Al-Azhar University qualified professors.

== Constituent Units ==
=== Centre of Excellence for Modern Languages ===
The Centre of Excellence for Modern Languages teaches English, Chinese and Urdu languages preparatory courses for students seeking to enroll in foreign and national universities (for example, HEC scholarships) or seeking employment. It also offers an English proficiency program.

=== International Institute of Islamic Economics ===
The university's International Institute of Islamic Economics was founded in 1983. It offers degrees in Islamic banking and finance, econometric and rural development. Within the faculty, the Division of Research and Training promotes research and offers training for staff of public and private financial and academic institutions.

== Grading System ==
The International Islamic University (IIU) uses an absolute grading system with a fixed range. The grading table is:

Grading Table
Percentage	Grade	GPA
80 and above	A+	4.00
75-79.99%	B+	3.50
70-74.99%	B	3.00
65-69.99%	C+	2.50
60-64.99%	C	2.00
55-59.99%	D+	1.50
50-54.99%	D	1.00
Below 50%	F	0.00

== Libraries ==
=== Central library ===
The central library is situated on the new campus. There is also the Muhammad Hamidullah and the International Institute of Islamic Economics library. It contains rare books on Islamic law relating to economics and Islamic governance. in this library you can read every department's books

=== Islamic Research Institute Library ===
The Islamic Research Institute library is a source of knowledge about Islam.

=== Engineering and technology Library ===
The engineering and technology library contains 25,000 books. Fifteen periodicals are subscribed and ten newspapers are purchased. The library can seat fifty users. There are 550 research reports and theses.

=== Da'wah Academy Library ===
Da’wah Academy Library has five types of libraries to fulfill the information needs of its research scholars, academicians, course participants, and the general public. These are Da’wah Research Library, Dr. Mehmood Ahmed Ghazi Library, Da’wah Centre for Women Library, Dawah Children Library Faisal Masjid Campus Islamabad and Regional Da’wah Centre (Sindh) Library, Karachi.

=== Shari'ah Academy Library ===
The Shariah Academy Library has a collection of 8,976 books and journals on the subjects of Qur'anic studies, Hadith studies, Prophet's Biography, Islamic law and Anglo-Saxon law. There are also a number of departmental libraries such as the Research Journals library, the Library of Islamic Studies, the Al-Dirassat Al-Islamyya, the Fikro Nazar, the Insights library and the Mayar library. The university publishes the Journal of Business and Management Sciences (JBMS).

=== Dr. Hamidullah Library ===
It is located in the basement of Faisal mosque and it has large volume of books on varieties of subjects.

== Hostels ==
The university infrastructure includes seven academic buildings. The university's student accommodation includes seven hostels for women and seven for men including Kuwait Hostel, located in the old campus adjacent to Faisal Masjid. Kuwait Hostel has seven sub-blocks in it.

== Mosque ==
Salman bin Abdulaziz Mosque is an under-construction grand mosque approved by King Salman bin Abdulaziz. It will be constructed in the H-10 sector Islamabad.

The mosque will accommodate 6,000 people, 2,000 for special prayers for women. The project will also include the Custodian of the Two Holy Mosques Library, Museum, Muhammad Bin Salman Conference Hall, Office Services Zone and Parking Area.

== Research journals ==
- Islamic Studies
- Al-Dirassat Al-Islamyya
- Insights
- Mayar
- Islamabad Law Review
- Fikr o Nazar
- Journal of Business and Management Sciences

== Foreign collaboration ==
The university has academic ties with:

- Al-Azhar University, Cairo, Egypt
- Umm al-Qura University, Makkah, Saudi Arabia
- Islamic University of Medina, Medina, Saudi Arabia
- King Abdulaziz University, Jeddah, Saudi Arabia
- Ningxia University, China

== Associations ==
- Academic Staff Welfare Association
- Officer Welfare Association
- University Staff Welfare Association

== See also ==
- List of Islamic educational institutions
