= Al-Tawhid: Its Implications for Thought and Life =

1982 book by Isma'il Raji al-Faruqi

- Cover for the 1992 second edition
- Author: Ismail al-Faruqi
- Language: English
- Subject: Islamic theology, Tawhid
- Published: 1982
- Publisher: International Institute of Islamic Thought
- Publication place: United States
- Media type: Print
- Pages: 367
- ISBN: 9780912463797
- OCLC: 12133143
- Preceded by: Islam and the Problem of Israel (1980)
- Followed by: Toward Islamic English (1986)

Al-Tawhid: Its Implications for Thought and Life is a book by Isma'il Raji al-Faruqi, first published in 1982. The work explores the central Islamic concept of Tawhid, the oneness and unity of God, and its implications for various aspects of life and thought.

== Background ==
Al-Faruqi was a scholar in Islamic studies and comparative religion. His work on Tawhid aimed to explore and articulate the influence of this concept on the Islamic worldview. The book was developed during his tenure at the International Institute of Islamic Thought. Al-Faruqi's emphasis on Tawhid "provides a coherent framework that guides Muslims in various aspects of their lives".

== Contents ==
The book is divided into several chapters, each addressing different aspects of Tawhid and its impact on individual and collective spheres of life.

=== The Meaning of Tawhid ===
Al-Faruqi begins by establishing Tawhid as the core of religious experience in Islam. He explains that recognizing God's unity and transcendence is fundamental to a Muslim's perception of reality and their relationship with the divine. This chapter lays the groundwork for understanding how Tawhid forms the foundation of the Islamic worldview, influencing perspectives on creation, existence, and the nature of reality.

=== Tawhid and the Worldview ===
This chapter explores Islamic metaphysics, describing the universe as orderly and purposeful, created by God with a specific design. Al-Faruqi emphasizes that the universe operates according to divine laws, which humans can understand through both reason and revelation. He discusses the integration of these sources of knowledge and rejects both skepticism and blind faith.

=== The Ethical Framework of Islam ===
Al-Faruqi outlines the ethical framework of Islam, emphasizing humanism, the purpose of creation, human innocence, and the importance of righteous deeds. He argues that the understanding of God's unity necessitates a commitment to justice, equality, and the common good. This chapter also delves into the significance of ethical behavior in both personal and social contexts.

=== Social Order and Tawhid ===
The social implications of Tawhid are discussed in this chapter, focusing on the concept of the ummah (community) and principles of social justice. Al-Faruqi presents the family as a fundamental unit in Islamic society and discusses the challenges it faces in the modern world. He advocates for the restoration of the family institution based on Islamic principles.

=== Political Implications of Tawhid ===
In this chapter, Al-Faruqi explores the political dimensions of Tawhid, focusing on the concept of Al-Khilafah (stewardship) and the integration of religious principles into governance. He emphasizes ethical leadership and justice as core tenets of Islamic political theory. The chapter also addresses the challenges and opportunities for the ummah in achieving political power.

=== Economic Principles and Tawhid ===
Al-Faruqi elaborates on the economic principles derived from Tawhid, highlighting the joint priority of material and spiritual aspects. He promotes social justice and balanced economic behavior, arguing that an economic system based on Tawhid fosters not only material well-being but also spiritual fulfillment.

=== Educational and Social Responsibilities ===
The final chapter discusses the educational and social responsibilities of the ummah, emphasizing the role of the community in promoting Islamic values and nurturing individual and collective responsibility. Al-Faruqi stresses the need for visionary leadership and proactive engagement in shaping history in alignment with divine guidance.

== Themes ==
The primary themes of the book include the integration of faith and reason, the comprehensive nature of the Islamic worldview, and the role of Tawhid in shaping ethical, social, and political structures. Al-Faruqi advocates for a balanced approach to knowledge, rejecting both skepticism and blind faith. Al-Faruqi's vision emphasizes the need for a "total change" driven by the principles of Tawhid, which includes the Islamization of knowledge and the reconstruction of societal institutions per Shari'ah.

The ideas of civilization as propounded by al-Faruqi and its significance in his Islamization of knowledge project are discussed, highlighting the integral role of the tawhidic principle in the construction of Islamic civilization. The concept of Islamization of knowledge in the book emphasizes monotheism while addressing the intellectual development of Muslim civilization by integrating Islamic moral standards with modern education.

== Reception and influence ==
Al-Tawhid: Its Implications for Thought and Life is generally considered to be a significant contribution to contemporary Islamic thought, providing insights into the Islamic worldview and its application to various aspects of life and society. One scholar notes that Al-Faruqi's work "represents a major contribution to the understanding of Islamic thought and its relevance to contemporary issues". Additionally, Al-Faruqi's emphasis on the integrative nature of Tawhid has influenced many subsequent works on Islamic theology and philosophy.

Al-Faruqi's exploration of Tawhid provided a comprehensive framework for Islamic renewal and reform. The theological implications of Al-Faruqi's interpretation of Tawhid in modern Islamic discourse are also discussed in academic studies

== Publication ==
Al-Tawhid: Its Implications for Thought and Life was first published in 1982 by the International Institute of Islamic Thought. A later edition was published in 1992 by A.S. Nordeen in Kuala Lumpur, Malaysia.
