= Islam and the Problem of Israel =

1980 book by Dr Isma'il Raji al-Faruqi

- Cover of the 2003 edition
- Author: Ismail al-Faruqi
- Language: English
- Subject: Islamic studies, Middle Eastern politics, Zionism
- Published: 1980
- Publisher: Islamic Council of Europe
- Publication place: United Kingdom
- Media type: Print
- Pages: 114
- ISBN: 9780907163022
- OCLC: 9105283
- Preceded by: Christian Ethics: A Historical and Systematic Analysis of Its Dominant Ideas (1967)
- Followed by: Al-Tawhid: Its Implications for Thought and Life (1982)

Islam and the Problem of Israel is a 1980 book by Ismail Raji al-Faruqi, published by the Islamic Council of Europe. It sets out an Islamic reading of the state of Israel, covering Zionism, Jewish and Islamic theology, and the politics of the Palestine conflict.

== Background ==
Ismail al-Faruqi, a Palestinian-American philosopher who worked in comparative religion and Islamic studies, wrote the book in response to the founding of Israel in 1948 and its consequences for the Muslim world. He set out to treat Zionism as a single system with intellectual, religious, and political dimensions.

== Contents ==
The book is organised into ten chapters.

=== Chapter I: The Three-Cornered Nature of the Problem ===
Al-Faruqi frames the conflict as a problem between three parties: the Muslim world, Western Christendom, and the Jews. He argues that it has no exact precedent. Modern colonialism and the Crusades each explain part of it, and neither explains the whole.

=== Chapter II: Aperçu of Jewish History in the Christian West ===
The chapter surveys Jewish life in Christian Europe before the Emancipation. Al-Faruqi argues that Christian theology, above all the charge of deicide tied to the crucifixion, shaped how Europe treated its Jewish minority.

=== Chapter III: The Emancipation and Its Aftermath ===
Al-Faruqi turns to Jewish emancipation in Europe and the strain it created. He sets out the bind facing emancipated Jews: assimilate and lose a distinct identity, or hold to that identity and stay apart.

=== Chapter IV: The Romantic Relapse of Europe ===
Al-Faruqi links the rise of European Romanticism to the formation of Zionist thought. He argues that romantic nationalism gave Jewish intellectuals a new language of collective identity, which then fed into Zionism.

=== Chapter V: Zionism: The European Jew’s Counsel of Despair ===
Al-Faruqi reads Zionism as a counsel of despair. He presents it as the response of European Jews to a situation they had come to see as hopeless, a search for security through a state of their own.

=== Chapter VI: Jewish Universalism and Ethnocentrism ===
The chapter sets two strands in Jewish tradition against each other, one universalist and one ethnocentric, and argues that the tension between them runs through later Zionist thought.

=== Chapter VII: Zionism as Religion ===
Al-Faruqi treats Zionism itself as a religion. He argues that it recasts Jewish tradition through European Romanticism and secular nationalism, turning a faith into a national project.

=== Chapter VIII: Zionism as Politics ===
Al-Faruqi follows Zionist politics before and after World War I. He works through the Balfour Declaration, the British Mandate in Palestine, and the methods used to acquire land and build the institutions of a future state.

=== Chapter IX: Islam and Judaism ===
The chapter sets Islam beside Judaism. Al-Faruqi reviews the historical record of Muslim-Jewish relations and lays out an Islamic critique of certain Jewish practices and claims.

=== Chapter X: Islam and Zionism ===
The final chapter gives Al-Faruqi's Islamic verdict on Zionism, which he holds to have wronged Jews and non-Jews alike. He proposes a settlement built on what he calls de-Zionization.

== Themes ==
Al-Faruqi treats Zionism as at once political, religious, and cultural, and judges it from an Islamic standpoint. He places its origins in modern European thought: Jewish assimilation after the Enlightenment, and a romantic nationalism that taught Europe to think in terms of peoples and homelands.

He compares Islamic and Jewish theology and argues that real doctrinal differences were hardened and rewritten under the pressure of the Palestine conflict. He also situates Zionism within Western colonial and strategic interests, among them military power and control of resources, and reads its idea of a "God-state" as one expression of European political theology and nationalism.

== Reception ==
The book found a wide readership in Islamic scholarly circles and among writers on Middle Eastern politics. Supporters credit it with a sustained Islamic analysis of Zionism. Critics charge that it argues from a fixed position against Zionism and the state of Israel.

== Publication ==
Islam and the Problem of Israel was first published in 1980 by the Islamic Council of Europe. A later edition appeared in 2003 from The Other Press in Kuala Lumpur, Malaysia.
