= Meta-religion =

Framework for comparing world religions

Meta-religion is a framework proposed by the Muslim philosopher Isma'il Raji al-Faruqi for the comparative and critical study of religion. It outlines the rational and ethical principles shared across faiths and treats religion as a universal human orientation toward the divine. Al-Faruqi described it as a “critical world theology,” a study of religion that crosses doctrinal boundaries while maintaining moral and intellectual integrity.

Meta-religion rejects both exclusivism and relativism, proposing that religious diversity reflects humanity’s varied encounters with a single truth. In interfaith studies, it serves as a bridge between Islamic thought and comparative theology, encouraging dialogue grounded in shared ethics rather than doctrine.

== Overview ==
Meta-religion assumes that all genuine religious traditions express a shared moral awareness of the divine, treating religion as a collective human response to God in history. For al-Faruqi, this required analysing religions through reason, ethics, and lived experience, rather than through apologetics or dogmatic assertion. The approach is both comparative and evaluative as it recognises that different faiths may reveal distinct facets of one ultimate truth, yet it insists that such diversity can be studied through the same rational and moral criteria.

Later analyses describe meta-religion as a higher level of understanding that transcends individual religious boundaries and identifies shared ethical and spiritual values across traditions. Scholars describe it as promoting mutual respect among faiths by recognising a common human quest for transcendence and meaning.

== Key characteristics ==
Al-Faruqi’s model is grounded in rational critique and moral objectivity. It rejects both relativism and confessional exclusivism, maintaining that truth in religion must be assessed through principles accessible to all human beings. According to this view, all faiths point toward a single Ultimate Reality, expressed through different historical and cultural forms. Revelation is seen as humanity’s recurring effort to recover its primordial disposition toward divine unity (fitra), while ethical commonality, rather than identical creeds, offers the most enduring basis for interreligious understanding.

While meta-religion recognises the distinctive features of every tradition, it interprets them as diverse articulations of a universal ethical and intellectual principle. This consciousness defines humanity as homo religiosus, the being oriented toward transcendence. The framework, therefore, treats religion not as an isolated set of doctrines, but as a universal dimension of human existence capable of rational and ethical reflection. Al-Faruqi regarded this universal disposition as the foundation of humanity's moral capacity and as evidence of a shared awareness of the divine.

== Historical development ==
Al-Faruqi first advanced the idea of a universal, critical study of religion in Christian Ethics: A Historical and Systematic Analysis of Its Dominant Ideas (1967), where he examined how moral reasoning could bridge the understanding between different faiths. He refined the concept in "Meta-Religion: Towards a Critical World Theology" (1986), calling for a discipline that would study religion as a universal human enterprise—open to critical inquiry yet grounded in ethical realism.

His work influenced subsequent Muslim scholars engaged in interfaith dialogue and the Islamization of knowledge, forming part of a broader intellectual movement seeking harmony between religion and reason in modern Islamic thought. Many of these scholars adopted the meta-religion framework as a means to reconcile faith and reason while situating Islam within the broader history of human religiosity.

== Applications ==
In the academic study of religion, meta-religion provides a rational and interdisciplinary method for analysing how different faiths express universal values and respond to shared moral challenges. In interfaith dialogue, it offers a platform for cooperation founded on ethical commonality rather than theological agreement, encouraging mutual recognition without erasing difference. Beyond theology, the framework has been used in cultural studies to explore how religious worldviews shape art, literature, and social ethics, highlighting the deep relationship between religion and civilisation. Similar universalist perspectives have appeared in the teachings of figures such as Sree Narayana Guru and Mahatma Gandhi, both of whom advocated ethical unity across religious and cultural boundaries.

Al-Faruqi saw these applications as steps toward overcoming religious antagonism and achieving a moral unity grounded in truth, justice, and the shared spiritual potential of humankind.

== Criticisms and reception ==
Some critics argue that formulating a universal religious norm risks reproducing Enlightenment rationalism by reducing diverse faiths to abstract categories of moral reason. Abdulkader Tayob contends that al-Faruqi’s framework reflects a Kantian structure of thought that may marginalise mystical or experiential dimensions of faith. Mikel Burley has similarly cautioned that pluralist frameworks such as al-Faruqi’s risk homogenising religious diversity by seeking convergence rather than doing “conceptual justice” to distinct metaphysical traditions. From a Christian standpoint, some argue that meta-religion’s ethical foundation reflects an Islamic conception of monotheism and is therefore not fully theologically neutral.

Other scholars have highlighted its contemporary relevance, noting that meta-religion provides an intellectual foundation for interfaith harmony and peace-building through shared ethical principles. Supporters regard it as one of the most systematic attempts to construct a philosophy of religion grounded in reason and universal moral values rather than sectarian exclusivism.

== See also ==
- Comparative religion
- Philosophy of religion
- Islamization of knowledge
- Perennial philosophy
