= Islamization of knowledge =

Concept integrating Islamic and modern knowledge

The Islamization of Knowledge (also abbreviated as IoK) is a conceptual framework originating from Islamic philosophy, advocating for the integration of Islamic teachings with modern academic disciplines, such as the social sciences, management sciences, humanities, sciences, engineering, and technology. This model emphasizes that all knowledge and scientific inquiry should align with the principles of Islam, aiming to foster a holistic understanding of the world through an Islamic worldview. This includes aligning ethical principles and scientific practices with Islamic teachings to address contemporary issues.

== Origins ==
The Islamization of Knowledge traces its roots to the 1977 Makkah conference, an influential event that initiated a dialogue among Islamic intellectuals regarding the role of Islam in shaping knowledge in the modern world. Among these intellectuals, Isma'il Raji al-Faruqi played a pivotal role in formalizing and articulating the concept. Al-Faruqi expressed concerns about the secularization of knowledge in Muslim societies, describing it as "the malaise of the ummah" (Muslim community). He argued that reliance on Western tools and analytical methods often led to breaches of Islamic ethics and a disconnect with the ecological and social realities of Muslim nations.

Al-Faruqi advocated for the revival of methods used in early Muslim philosophy, the restoration of ijtihad (independent reasoning), and the integration of scientific methodologies within the boundaries of Islam. His theoretical framework and work plan for this concept were outlined in his 1982 book, Islamization of Knowledge: General Principles and Work Plan, which remains a foundational reference.

== Principles and frameworks ==
The Islamization of Knowledge emphasizes the integration of Islamic teachings with modern disciplines by critiquing and re-evaluating contemporary fields through an Islamic perspective. Ismail al-Faruqi’s 12-step work plan systematically integrates Islamic principles with modern disciplines. It focuses on mastery of modern sciences, understanding Islamic knowledge in various fields, and establishing the relevance of Islamic values to contemporary academic disciplines. Al-Faruqi's approach critiques Western epistemologies and recasts them within an Islamic worldview, harmonizing ethical and intellectual pursuits with the tenets of Islam.

In Southeast Asia, Syed Muhammad Naquib al-Attas developed a complementary framework. He emphasized linguistic and philosophical foundations, focusing on the role of adab (proper conduct) and the metaphysical aspects of knowledge. His contributions shaped the curricula of institutions like ISTAC, which he helped establish.

Abdullah Berghout, a contemporary scholar, proposed a quality-management system model for Islamization, incorporating Islamic perspectives into modern academic disciplines. His framework emphasizes input, procedure, output, and feedback, focusing on intellectual, psychomotor, and affective domains, with particular emphasis on the affective domain.

The implementation of Islamization involves steps such as mastering modern disciplines, analyzing their history and development, mastering Islamic legacy, and critically evaluating modern knowledge from an Islamic perspective. It includes synthesizing Islamic and modern knowledge and reformulating these disciplines within an Islamic framework.

== Reception and critiques ==
Supporters argue that the Islamization of Knowledge enables Muslims to maintain their religious identity in a secular world while benefiting from modern advancements. Critics, however, highlight potential risks, such as conflating religion with science, restricting academic freedom, and imposing a single interpretation of Islam on diverse Muslim societies.

== Impact and legacy ==
The concept has significantly influenced academic institutions such as the International Institute of Islamic Thought (IIIT), which advances research on Islamic epistemology and interdisciplinary studies. Similarly, institutions like IIUM have implemented integrated curricula combining Islamic values with modern disciplines, serving as models for others globally.

== See also ==
- Islamization
- Islamic advice literature
- Islamic revival
- Early Islamic philosophy
- Islamic philosophy
- Torah Umadda, a philosophy concerning the interrelationship of secular knowledge and Jewish knowledge
