= Abdul Hamid AbuSulayman =

Islamic scholar (1936–2021)

Yang Hormat Dato' Indera Abdul Hamid AbuSulayman SIMP

2nd Rector of the International Islamic University Malaysia
- In office 1989–1999
- Chancellor: Ahmad Shah
- Preceded by: Muhammad Abdul Rauf
- Succeeded by: Mohd. Kamal Hassan

Personal details
- Born: 1936 Makkah, Saudi Arabia
- Died: 18 August 2021 (aged 84)
- Education: Cairo University; University of Pennsylvania
- Occupation: Researcher

Abdul Hamid Ahmad AbuSulayman (Arabic: عبد الحميد أحمد أبو سليمان) 1936 – 18 August 2021) was an internationally renowned Islamic scholar, thinker, educationist and author of many books and articles on the subject of Islam and Islamic reform, especially in the fields of thought and education. He was Chairman of the International Institute of Islamic Thought (IIIT) and was the Founding President of the International Islamic University Malaysia (IIUM) between 1989 and 1999.

== Educational background ==
AbuSulayman obtained degrees of Bachelor of Arts in Commerce and Master of Arts in Political Science in 1959 and 1963 respectively; both were from the Cairo University. Ten years later, he was awarded the degree of Doctor of Philosophy in International Relations from the University of Pennsylvania. His doctoral thesis entitled "Towards an Islamic Theory of International Relations: New Directions for Islamic Methodology and Thought", was published in the form of a book by IIIT.

== Career ==
AbuSulayman started his career as a lecturer at King Saud University in Riyadh, Saudi Arabia, where he chaired Department of Political Science from 1982 to 1984. He then moved to Malaysia, where he served IIUM also as a lecturer. In 1989, he succeeded Tan Sri Dr. Muhammad Abdul Rauf of Egypt as the second Rector of IIUM and served in the office until 1999. During his rectory, IIUM grew from a humble Madrasah of high school standard to a world class university with 15,000 student enrolment on a new campus that is considered a landmark in functional modern Islamic architecture.

Post his rectory in IIUM, he joined IIIT and became its chairman.

== Recognition ==
In recognition of his service to Malaysia and Muslims around the world, in 2016, his name was put in a Centre for Collaborative Research set up by IIUM under Faculty of Islamic Revealed Knowledge and Human Sciences. Earlier in 2008, IIUM awarded him the degree of Honorary Doctor of Philosophy in Education.

=== Honours ===
- Pahang :
  - Grand Knight of the Order of the Crown of Pahang (SIMP) – formerly Dato', now Dato' Indera (1992)

== English publications ==
- Parent-Child Relations: A Guide to Raising Children, Washington: IIIT, 2013.
- The Qur'anic Worldview: A Springboard for Cultural Reform, Washington: IIIT, 2011.
- Revitalizing Higher Education in the Muslim World, Washington: IIIT, 2007.
- Marital Discord: Recapturing the Full Islamic Spirit of Human Dignity, Washington: IIIT, 2003.
- Crisis in the Muslim Mind (Trans. Yusuf Talal DeLorenzo), Washington: IIIT, 1993.
- Towards an Islamic Theory of International Relations, Washington: IIIT, 1993.
