= Islamic Research Institute =

Research institute in Pakistan

- Motto: ليتفقهوا في الدين
- Motto in English: "To obtain understanding in the religion"
- Parent institution: International Islamic University, Islamabad
- Established: 1960
- Director General: Muhammad Zia-ul-Haq
- Formerly called: Central Institute of Islamic Research
- Location: Islamabad, Pakistan
- Website: https://iri.iiu.edu.pk/

The Islamic Research Institute (IRI) is a religious research institute affiliated with the International Islamic University in Islamabad. It was initially a research division of the Government of Pakistan, founded in 1960 as a result of a constitutional requirement. In 1980, it became the research institute of the then newly founded Islamic University, Islamabad. The Institute remained a section of the University when it acquired its new charter as International Islamic University in 1985.

In order to help Pakistani society and the Muslim Ummah live in accordance with Islamic principles, the Institute's main goals are to develop the research methods for research in the different fields of Islamic learning, identify current issues, and study and interpret Islamic teachings in light of modern intellectual and scientific advancement.

Professor Dr. Muhammad Zia-ul-Haq is serving as the current director general.

== Dr. Muhammad Hamidullah Library ==
The library which is named after the well known scholar Muhammad Hamidullah, it is located in Faisal Masjid campus has more than 200,000 books on various subjects. Since October 2019, the library has been open to membership which is now accessible to the general public.

In the library, a regular study center has been built on Muhammad, while the Quran, religions and comparative religions, Islamic and other laws, Islamic Shari'a, history of Pakistan, including 180,000 books of very high quality.

== Journals ==
=== Islamic Studies ===
Islamic Studies is a peer-reviewed international research journal since 1962, published by Islamic Research Institute.

=== Fikr-o-Nazar ===
Fikr-u-Nazar is a quarterly online journal of IRI.

=== Al-Dirasat Al-Islamyyah ===
Al-Dirasat Al-Islamyyah is an interdisciplinary journal of peer-reviewed research and informed opinion on various intellectual and academic issues in the areas of Islamic studies.
