= Criticism of Christianity =

Criticism of Christianity has a long history that stretches back to the initial formation of the religion in the Roman Empire. Critics have challenged Christian beliefs and teachings, as well as actions taken in the name of the faith, from the Crusades to modern terrorism. The arguments against Christianity include claims that it is a faith of violence, corruption, superstition, polytheism, homophobia, bigotry, pontification, abuses of women's rights, and sectarianism.

In the early years of Christianity, the Neoplatonic philosopher Porphyry emerged as one of the major critics with his book Against the Christians, along with other writers like Celsus and Julian. Porphyry argued that Christianity was based on false prophecies that had not yet materialized. Following the adoption of Christianity by the Roman Empire, dissenting religious voices were gradually suppressed by both governmental and ecclesiastical authorities. Christianity has faced significant theological criticism from thinkers of other Abrahamic religions, particularly including Judaism and Islam. Notably, Maimonides, the renowned rabbi, Jewish philosopher, and Torah scholar of the 12th century, argued that Christian practices and doctrines constituted idolatry and deviated from the strict monotheism (shituf) of Jewish and Muslim theologies. Similarly, Islamic scholars have critiqued Christian beliefs about the Trinity and the divinity of Jesus, viewing these concepts as incompatible with the concept of monotheism. These critiques reflect deep theological disagreements rooted in their shared scriptural traditions and divergent doctrinal interpretations. A millennium later, the Protestant Reformation led to a fundamental split in European Christianity and rekindled critical voices about the Christian faith, both internally and externally. In the 18th century, deist philosophers such as Voltaire and Jean-Jacques Rousseau were critical of Christianity as a revealed religion. With the Age of Enlightenment, Christianity was criticized by major thinkers and philosophers, such as David Hume, Thomas Paine, and the Baron d'Holbach. The central theme of these critiques sought to negate the historical accuracy of the Christian Bible and focused on the perceived corruption of Christian religious authorities. Other thinkers, like Immanuel Kant, offered critiques of traditional arguments for the existence of God, while professing to defend Christian theology on novel grounds.

In modernity, Christianity has faced substantial criticism from a wide array of political movements and ideologies. In the late eighteenth century, the French Revolution saw a number of politicians and philosophers criticizing traditional Christian doctrines, precipitating a wave of secularism in which hundreds of churches were closed and thousands of priests were deported or killed. Following the French Revolution, prominent philosophers of liberalism and communism, such as John Stuart Mill and Karl Marx, criticized Christian doctrine on the grounds that it was conservative and anti-democratic. Friedrich Nietzsche wrote that Christianity fosters a kind of slave morality that suppresses the desires contained in the human will. The Russian Revolution, the Chinese Communist Revolution, and several other modern revolutionary movements have also led to the criticism of Christian ideas.

Christians' formal response to such criticisms is described as Christian apologetics. Philosophers like Augustine of Hippo and Thomas Aquinas have been some of the most prominent defenders of the Christian religion since its foundation.

== Scripture ==
=== Biblical criticism ===
Biblical criticism, in particular higher criticism, encompasses a variety of methods that have been used since the Age of Enlightenment in the early 18th century, as scholars began applying the same methods and perspectives already used for other literary and philosophical texts to biblical documents. It is an umbrella term that covers various techniques that mainline and liberal Christian theologians mainly use to study the meaning of biblical passages. It uses general historical principles and is primarily based on reason rather than revelation or faith. There are four primary types of biblical criticism:

- Form criticism: analysis of literary documents, particularly the Bible, to discover earlier oral traditions (stories, legends, myths, etc.) upon which they were based.
- Tradition criticism: analysis of the Bible concentrating on how religious traditions grew and changed over the time the text was written.
- Higher criticism: the study of the sources and literary methods employed by the biblical authors.
- Lower criticism: the discipline and study of the actual wording of the Bible; a quest for textual purity and understanding.

==== Textual criticism ====
Within the abundance of biblical manuscripts, a number of textual variants exist. The vast majority of these textual variants are the inconsequential misspelling of words, word order variations, and the mistranscription of abbreviations. Text critics such as Bart D. Ehrman have proposed that some of these textual variants and interpolations were theologically motivated. Ehrman's conclusions and textual variant choices have been challenged by some conservative evangelical reviewers like Daniel B. Wallace, Craig Blomberg, and Thomas A. Howe.

In attempting to determine the original text of the New Testament books, some modern textual critics have identified sections as probably not original. In modern translations of the Christian Bible, the results of textual criticism have led to certain verses being omitted or marked as non-original. These possible later additions include the following:

- The ending of Mark
- The story in John of the woman taken in adultery, the Pericope Adulterae
- An explicit reference to the Trinity in 1 John, the Johannine Comma

In The Text of the New Testament, Kurt and Barbara Aland compare the total number of variant-free verses, and the number of variants per page (excluding orthographic errors), among the seven major editions of the Greek New Testament (Tischendorf, Westcott-Hort, von Soden, Vogels, Merk, Bover and Nestle-Aland) concluding 62.9% (4999/7947) agreement. They concluded,

Thus in nearly two-thirds of the New Testament text, the seven editions of the Greek New Testament which we have reviewed are in complete accord, with no differences other than in orthographical details (e.g., the spelling of names, etc.). Verses in which any one of the seven editions differs by a single word are not counted. This result is quite amazing, demonstrating a far greater agreement among the Greek texts of the New Testament during the past century than textual scholars would have suspected... In the Gospels, Acts, and Revelation the agreement is less, while in the letters it is much greater.

The discovery of the Hebrew Bible (Old Testament) texts among the Dead Sea Scrolls has been taken to demonstrate a high degree of accuracy in the transmission of Old Testament texts:

The biblical scrolls are significant because they disclose the manner in which ancient scribes and copyists transmitted the Bible from generation to generation. These scrolls also provide us with confidence that our Old Testament has been preserved with a high degree of accuracy...

=== Internal consistency ===
Inconsistencies in the Christian Bible have been pointed out by critics and skeptics, presenting as difficulties the different numbers and names for the same feature and different sequences for what is supposed to be the same event. Responses to these criticisms include the modern documentary hypothesis, two-source hypothesis (in various guises), and assertions that the Pastoral Epistles are pseudonymous. Contrasting with these critical stances are positions supported by traditionalists, considering the texts to be consistent, with the Torah written by a single source, but the Gospels by four independent witnesses, and all of the Pauline Epistles, except possibly the Epistle to the Hebrews, as having been written by Paul the Apostle.

While consideration of the context is necessary when studying the Christian Bible, some find the accounts of the resurrection of Jesus within the four Gospels of Matthew, Mark, Luke and John, difficult to reconcile. E. P. Sanders concluded that the inconsistencies make the possibility of a deliberate fraud unlikely: "A plot to foster belief in the Resurrection would probably have resulted in a more consistent story. Instead, there seems to have been a competition: 'I saw him,' 'So did I,' 'The women saw him first,' 'No, I did; they didn't see him at all,' and so on."

Harold Lindsell points out that it is a "gross distortion" to state that people who believe in biblical inerrancy suppose every statement made in the Bible is true (opposed to accurate). He indicates there are expressly false statements in the Bible that are reported accurately. For example, Satan is a liar whose lies are accurately reported as to what he actually said. Proponents of biblical inerrancy generally do not teach that the Bible was dictated directly by God, but that God used the "distinctive personalities and literary styles of the writers" of scripture and that God's inspiration guided them to flawlessly project his message through their own language and personality.

Those who believe in the inspiration of scripture teach that it is infallible (or inerrant), that is, free from error in the truths it expresses by its character as the word of God. However, the scope of what this encompasses is disputed, as the term includes 'faith and practice' positions, with some denominations holding that the historical or scientific details, which may be irrelevant to matters of faith and Christian practice, may contain errors. Other scholars take stronger views, but for a few verses, these positions require more exegetical work, leading to dispute (compare the serious debate over the related issue of perspicuity, attracting biblical and philosophical discussion).

Infallibility refers to the original texts of the Bible, and all mainstream scholars acknowledge the potential for human error in transmission and translation; yet, through the use of textual criticism modern (critical) copies are considered to "faithfully represent the original", and our understanding of the original language sufficiently well for accurate translation. The opposing view is that there is too much corruption, or translation too difficult, to agree with modern texts.

=== Unfulfilled prophecy ===
Hundreds of years before the time of Jesus, Jewish prophets promised that a messiah would come. Judaism claims that Jesus did not fulfill these prophecies. Other skeptics usually claim that the prophecies are either vague or unfulfilled, or that the Hebrew Bible influenced the composition of New Testament narratives. Christian apologists claim that Jesus fulfilled these prophecies, which they argue are nearly impossible to fulfill by chance. Many Christians anticipate the Second Coming of Jesus, during which he is expected to fulfill the rest of what they believe are messianic prophecies, such as the Last Judgment, the resurrection of the dead, establishment of the Kingdom of God, and the Messianic Age.

The New Testament traces Jesus's line to that of David; however, according to Stephen L. Harris:

Jesus did not accomplish what Israel's prophets said the Messiah was commissioned to do: He did not deliver the covenant people from their Gentile enemies, reassemble those scattered in the Diaspora, restore the Davidic kingdom, or establish universal peace (cf. Isa. 9:6–7; 11:7–12:16, etc.). Instead of freeing Jews from oppressors and thereby fulfilling God's ancient promises—for land, nationhood, kingship, and blessing—Jesus died a "shameful" death, defeated by the very political powers the Messiah was prophesied to overcome. Indeed, the Hebrew prophets did not foresee that Israel's savior would be executed as a common criminal by Gentiles, making Jesus' crucifixion a "stumbling block" to scripturally literate Jews. (1 Cor.1:23)

Christian preachers reply to this argument by stating that Jesus will fulfil these prophecies in the Millennial Reign after the Great Tribulation, according to New Testament prophecies, especially in the Book of Revelation.

The 16th-century Jewish theologian Isaac ben Abraham of Troki, who lived in Trakai, Lithuania, penned a work entitled Chizzuk Emunah (חזוק אמונה, 'Faith Strengthened') that attempted to refute the Christian claim that Jesus was the Messiah prophesied in the Hebrew Bible and that Christianity represented a "New Covenant" of God (i.e., that the originally Jewish covenants with God had been replaced). He systematically identified a number of inconsistencies in the New Testament, contradictions between the New Testament and the Hebrew Bible, and prophesies that remained unfulfilled in Jesus's lifetime. In addition, he questioned a number of Christian practices, such as the Sunday Sabbath. Written originally for Jews to persuade them not to convert to Christianity, the work was eventually read by Christians. While the well-known Christian Hebraist Johann Christoph Wagenseil attempted an elaborate refutation of Abraham's arguments, Wagenseil's Latin translation of it only increased interest in the work and inspired later Christian freethinkers. Chizzuk Emunah was praised as a masterpiece by Voltaire.

On the other hand, Blaise Pascal believed that "[t]he prophecies are the strongest proof of Jesus Christ". He wrote that Jesus was foretold and that the prophecies came from a succession of people over a span of four thousand years. Apologist Josh McDowell defends the fulfillment of Old Testament (Hebrew Bible) prophecy as supporting Christianity, arguing that prophecies fulfilled by Jesus include ones relating to his ancestral line, birthplace, virgin birth, miracles, manner of death, and resurrection. He says that even the timing of the Messiah in years and in relation to events is predicted, and that the Jewish Talmud—which, though largely uninterested in the early Christian movement, expressly rejected Jesus as the Messiah—laments that the Messiah had not appeared despite the "scepter" being taken away from Judah.

==== Prophecy of the Nazarene ====
Another allegation concerns the reference to the Nazarene in Matthew 2:23:

And he came and dwelt in a city called Nazareth, that it might be fulfilled which was by the prophets, He shall be called a Nazarene.

The website for Jews for Judaism claims that "Matthew's claim immediately raises a red flag to anyone knowledgeable of the Jewish bible. Nowhere in the Jewish bible does it say that someone would be called a Nazarene [from Nazareth]. Moreover, this would be impossible since the city of Nazareth did not exist in the time of Jewish scriptures." However, Ken Dark states that the combined evidence of three archaeological sites indicates that, "The settlement clearly did exist in the early first century" BCE, probably from "the Late Hellenistic period onward, as a Jewish community." On the other hand, the time period described by the Hebrew Bible is generally considered to end by c. 430 BCE, and the last Hebrew prophet, Malachi, is dated to around then.

There is also the common suggestion that the New Testament verse is based on a passage relating to Nazirites, either because this was a misunderstanding common at the time or because early Christians deliberately reinterpreted the term. Another suggestion is "that Matthew was playing on the similarity of the Hebrew word nezer (translated 'Branch' or 'shoot' in Isaiah 11:1 and Jeremiah 23:5) with the Greek nazoraios, here translated 'Nazarene.'" Christians also suggest that by using an indirect quotation and the plural term prophets, "Matthew was only saying that by living in Nazareth, Jesus was fulfilling the many Old Testament prophecies that He would be despised and rejected." The background for this is illustrated by Nathanael's initial response (in John 1:46) to the idea that Jesus might be the Messiah: "Nazareth! Can anything good come from there?"

=== Virgin Birth and descent of Jesus ===
A fundamental principle of the Christian faith is that Jesus was born of Mary, a virgin. Both Matthew and Luke trace the genealogy of Joseph back to David. According to Jewish tradition, the Messiah must be a descendant of David, but if Jesus was born of a virgin, he cannot be a descendant of David through Joseph. Michael Martin asserts that Mary's virginity is a later addition to Christianity as indicated through Paul's letters. Further, Martin notes that early Christian communities did not seem to have widely believed in the virgin birth. The confusion surrounding the virginity of Mary may result from Septuagint translation of both Hebrew: עַלְמָה, romanized: almah "young girl" and Hebrew: בְּתוּלָה, romanized: bethulah, "virgin" into Greek: παρθένος, romanized: parthenos, which usually means virgin. Relying on this translation, Matthew tried to show that Jesus's virgin birth was foretold in Isaiah 7:14—which refers to an almah in Hebrew.

=== Selective interpretation ===
Critics argue that the selective invocation of portions of the Old Testament is hypocritical, particularly when those portions endorse hostility towards women and homosexuals, when other portions are considered obsolete, such as dietary prohibitions. The entire Mosaic Law is described in Galatians 3:24–25 as a tutor which is no longer necessary, according to some interpretations; see also Antinomianism in the New Testament.

On the other hand, many of the Old Testament laws are seen as being specifically abrogated by the New Testament, such as circumcision, though this may simply be a parallel to Jewish Noahide Laws. See also Split of early Christianity and Judaism. On the other hand, other passages are pro-law, such as Romans 3:31: "Do we then make void the law through faith? Certainly not! On the contrary, we establish the law." See also Pauline passages opposing antinomianism.

=== Mistranslation ===
Translation has given rise to a number of issues, as the original languages are often quite different in grammar as well as word meaning. While the Chicago Statement on Biblical Inerrancy states that inerrancy applies only to the original languages, some believers trust their own translation to be the accurate one. One such group of believers is known as the King James Only movement. For readability, clarity, or other reasons, translators may choose different wording or sentence structure, and some translations may choose to paraphrase passages. Because some of the words in the original language have ambiguous or difficult-to-translate meanings, debates over the correct interpretation occur.

Criticisms are also sometimes raised because of inconsistencies arising between different English translations of the Hebrew or Greek text. Some Christian interpretations are criticized for reflecting specific doctrinal bias or a variant reading between the Masoretic Hebrew and Septuagint Greek manuscripts often quoted in the New Testament.

== Criticism of historical behavior ==
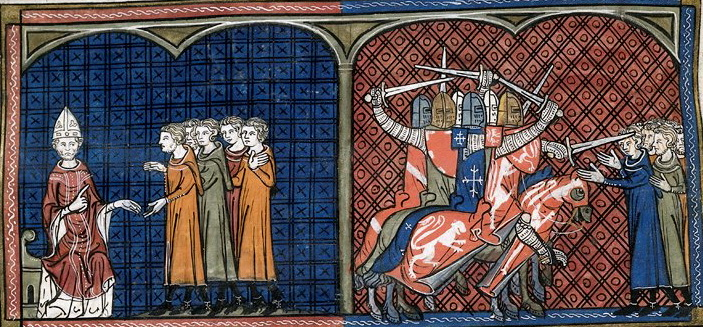
Pope Innocent III excommunicating the Albigensians (left), Massacre against the Albigensians by the crusaders

Certain interpretations of some moral decisions in the Bible are considered ethically questionable by human rights activists and scholars, historians, and critics of religion. Some of the passages most commonly criticized include colonialism, the subjugation of women, religious intolerance, condemnation of homosexuality and transgender identity, and support for the institution of slavery in both Old and New Testaments.

=== Colonialism ===
Christianity and colonialism are often closely associated because Catholicism and Protestantism were the religions of the European colonial powers and acted in many ways as the "religious arm" of those powers. Historian Edward E. Andrews argues that although Christian missionaries were initially portrayed as "visible saints, exemplars of ideal piety in a sea of persistent savagery", by the time the colonial era drew to a close in the last half of the twentieth century missionaries became viewed as "ideological shock troops for colonial invasion whose zealotry blinded them."

Christianity is targeted by critics of colonialism because the tenets of the religion were used to justify the actions of the colonists. For example, Michael Wood asserts that the indigenous peoples were not considered to be human beings and that the colonisers were shaped by "centuries of Ethnocentrism, and Christian monotheism, which espoused one truth, one time and version of reality."

=== Slavery ===
Early Christian perspectives of slavery were formed in the contexts of Christianity's roots in Judaism, and as part of the wider culture of slavery in the Roman Empire. Slavery was widespread in the Roman Empire, including at the time of Augustus when Jesus was born. Both the Old and New Testaments recognize that the institution of slavery existed, with the former sanctioning it within certain limits (Leviticus 25:39–46, Exodus 21:2–21).

Saint Paul the Apostle in addressing slavery in Ephesians 6:5–8 tells slaves to "obey your earthly masters" and "render service with enthusiasm, as to the Lord and not to men and women." Defenders of Christianity argue that nothing in the passage affirms slavery as a naturally valid or divinely mandated institution. Rather, Paul's discussion of the duties of Christian slaves and the responsibilities of Christian masters transforms the institution, even if it falls short of calling for outright abolition. St. Augustine thought slavery was a result of sin, but was part of the fallen world and so should be tolerated. However, others opposed it: John Chrysostom explicitly argued that slavery itself was a sin, but he did not advocate for its abolition; Origen called for the practice of manumission after six years as found in the Old Testament; others, such as Gregory of Nyssa, Acacius of Amida, and St. Patrick, called for the complete abolition of slavery.

On the other hand, critics claim that Orthodox Christianity justified slavery on the ground that it was part of the divinely ordained hierarchical order. Slaves are enjoined to be submissive in the Ephesians passage above as well as other parts of the Bible, such as in Paul's Epistle to the Colossians: "Slaves, obey your earthly masters [kyrioi] according to the flesh in everything, not only while being watched and in order to please them, but wholeheartedly, fearing the Lord [kyrios]". In addition, John Chrysostom wrote "The slave should be resigned to his lot, in obeying his master he is obeying God" while St. Augustine wrote: "...slavery is now penal in character and planned by that law which commands the preservation of the natural order and forbids disturbance".

According to one view, today and from a human rights perspective, it is difficult to understand why early Christians did not object to the social institution of slavery. It is uncertain whether one can go so far as to criticise Early Christians, including Paul and other authors of Biblical texts, for their active or passive acceptance of slavery. Peter Gruszka attributed the view of early Christian Fathers on slavery to their social environment. In the 2nd and 3rd centuries, the most prominent fathers such as Clement, Tertullian, Cyprian, Origen and others emerged in Africa and Egypt, where slavery did not exist on a large scale. Different was the social environment in Eastern Mediterranean, Syria, Palestine and especially Asia Minor, where slavery was a strong presence and therefore attracted the attention of the Cappadocian fathers of the 4th century.

According to Jennifer Glancy, sexual exploitation of slaves in the Roman Empire was helped by Christian morality. Jesus urged his followers to act like slaves, implementing a slave morality. The early Christian theologians were unconcerned about slave morals. In the Eastern Roman Empire (Byzantine), a shift in the view of slavery is noticed, which by the 10th century transformed gradually a slave-object into a slave-subject.

Since the Middle Ages, the Christian understanding of slavery has been subjected to significant internal conflict and has endured dramatic change. Nearly all Christian leaders before the late 17th century recognised slavery, within specific biblical limitations, as consistent with Christian theology. The key verse used to justify slavery was Genesis 9:25–27: "Cursed be Canaan! The lowest of slaves will he be to his brothers. He also said, 'Blessed be the Lord, the God of Shem! May Canaan be the slave of Shem." which was interpreted to mean that Africans were the descendants of Ham, cursed with "the mark of Ham" to be servants to the descendants of Japheth (Europeans) and Shem (Asians). In 1452, Pope Nicholas V instituted the hereditary slavery of captured Muslims and pagans, regarding all non-Christians as "enemies of Christ".

The "Curse of Ham" along with Paul's Epistle to the Ephesians 6:5–7 helped American slave owners to balance their beliefs with slavery. The Southern Baptist Convention separated from the Triennial Convention in order to support slavery, which the southern churches regarded as "an institution of heaven". The New Testament was ignored except in reminding that Jesus never condemned slavery and the Epistle to Philemon, in which a runaway slave was returned to his owner, although Paul urges the owner to treat him "no longer as a slave, but better than a slave, as a dear brother".

==== Christian abolitionist movements ====
Rodney Stark makes the argument that Christianity helped to end slavery worldwide, as does Lamin Sanneh. These authors take the position that Christians who viewed slavery as wrong on the basis of their religious convictions spearheaded abolitionism, and many of the early campaigners for the abolition of slavery were driven by their Christian faith and a desire to realize their view that all people are equal under God. In the late 17th century, Anabaptists began to criticize slavery. Criticisms from the Society of Friends, Mennonites, and the Amish followed suit. Prominent among these Christian abolitionists were William Wilberforce and John Woolman. Harriet Beecher Stowe wrote her famous book, Uncle Tom's Cabin, according to her Christian beliefs in 1852. Earlier, in Britain and America, Quakers were active in abolitionism. A group of Quakers founded the first English abolitionist organization in 1783, and a Quaker petition brought the issue before government that same year. The Quakers continued to be influential throughout the lifetime of the movement, in many ways leading the way for the campaign. John Wesley, the founder of Methodism, was instrumental in starting abolitionism as a popular movement.

Many modern Christians are united in the condemnation of slavery as wrong and contrary to God's will. Only peripheral groups such as the Ku Klux Klan and other so-called Christian hate groups on the racist fringes of the Christian Reconstructionist and Christian Identity movements advocate the reinstitution of slavery. Full adherents to reconstructionism are few and marginalized among conservative Christians. With these exceptions, Christian faith groups now condemn slavery, and see the practice as incompatible with basic Christian principles.

In addition to aiding abolitionism, many Christians made further efforts toward establishing racial equality, contributing to the civil rights movement. The African American Review notes the important role Christian revivalism in the black church played in the Civil Rights Movement. Martin Luther King Jr., an ordained Baptist minister, was a leader of the American civil rights movement and president of the Southern Christian Leadership Conference, a Christian Civil Rights organization.

=== Christianity and women ===
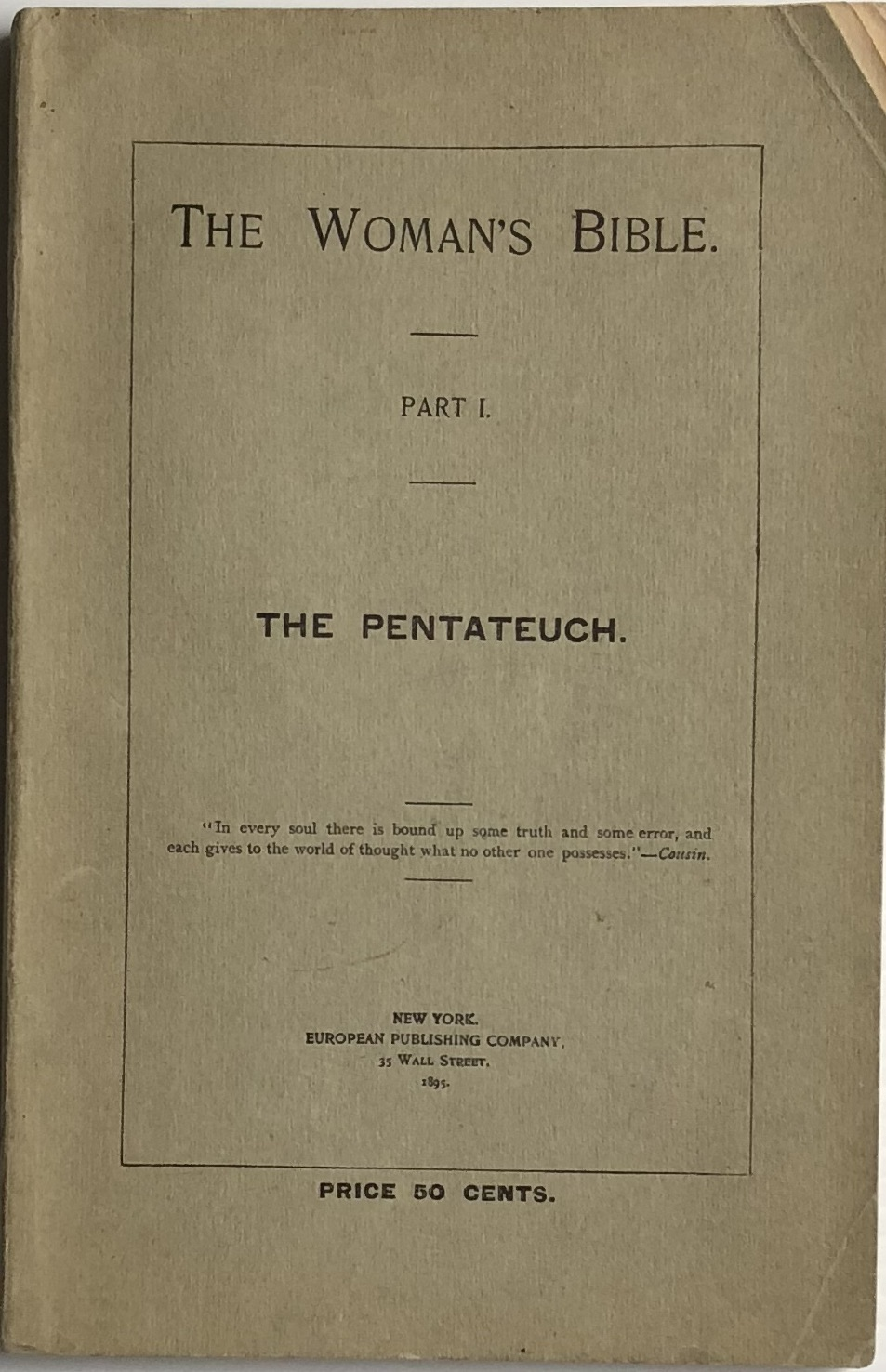
The Woman's Bible (1895) is a collection of critical commentaries on texts within chapters of the Bible referring to women

Many feminists have accused notions such as a male God, male prophets, and the man-centered stories in the Bible of contributing to a patriarchy. Though many women disciples and servants are recorded in the Pauline epistles, there have been occasions in which women have been denigrated and forced into a second-class status. For example, women were told to keep silent in the churches for "it is a shame for a woman to speak in the church". Suffragist Elizabeth Cady Stanton said in The Woman's Bible that "the Bible in its teachings degrades women from Genesis to Revelation".

Elizabeth Clark cites early Christian writings by authors such as Tertullian, Augustine, and John Chrysostom as being exemplary of the negative view of women that has been perpetuated in church tradition. Until the latter part of the 20th century, only the names of very few women who contributed to the formation of Christianity in its earliest years were widely known: Mary, the mother of Jesus; Mary Magdalene, disciple of Jesus and the first witness to the resurrection; and Mary and Martha, the sisters who offered him hospitality in Bethany.

Harvard scholar Karen King writes that more of the many women who contributed to the formation of Christianity in its earliest years are becoming known. Further, she concludes that for centuries in Western Christianity, Mary Magdalene has been wrongly identified as the adulteress and repentant prostitute presented in John 8—a connection supposed by tradition but nowhere claimed in the New Testament. According to King, the Gospel of Mary shows that she was an influential figure, a prominent disciple and leader of one wing of the early Christian movement that promoted women's leadership.

King claims that every sect within early Christianity which had advocated women's prominence in ancient Christianity was eventually declared heretical, and evidence of women's early leadership roles was erased or suppressed.

Classicist Evelyn Stagg and New Testament scholar Frank Stagg in their jointly authored book, Woman in the World of Jesus, document very unfavorable attitudes toward women that prevailed in the world into which Jesus came. They assert that there is no recorded instance where Jesus disgraces, belittles, reproaches, or stereotypes a woman. They interpret the recorded treatment and attitude Jesus showed to women as evidence that the Founder of Christianity treated women with great dignity and respect. Various theologians have concluded that the canonical examples of the manner of Jesus are instructive for inferring his attitudes toward women. They are seen as showing repeatedly and consistently how he liberated and affirmed women. However, Schalom Ben-Chorin argues that Jesus' reply to his mother in John 2:4 during the wedding at Cana amounted to a blatant violation of the commandment to honor one's parent.

=== Christianity and violence ===
Many critics of Christianity have cited the violent acts of Christian nations as a reason to denounce the religion. The science fiction writer Arthur C. Clarke said that he could not forgive religions because they endorsed atrocities and wars over time. Richard Dawkins makes a similar case in his book, The God Delusion. In the counterargument book The Dawkins Delusion?, Alister McGrath responds to Dawkins by suggesting that, far from endorsing "out-group hostility", Jesus commanded an ethic of "out-group affirmation". McGrath agrees that it is necessary to critique religion, but he says that Dawkins seems to be unaware that it possesses internal means of reform and renewal. While Christians may certainly be accused of failing to live up to Jesus' standard of acceptance, it lies at the heart of the Christian ethic.

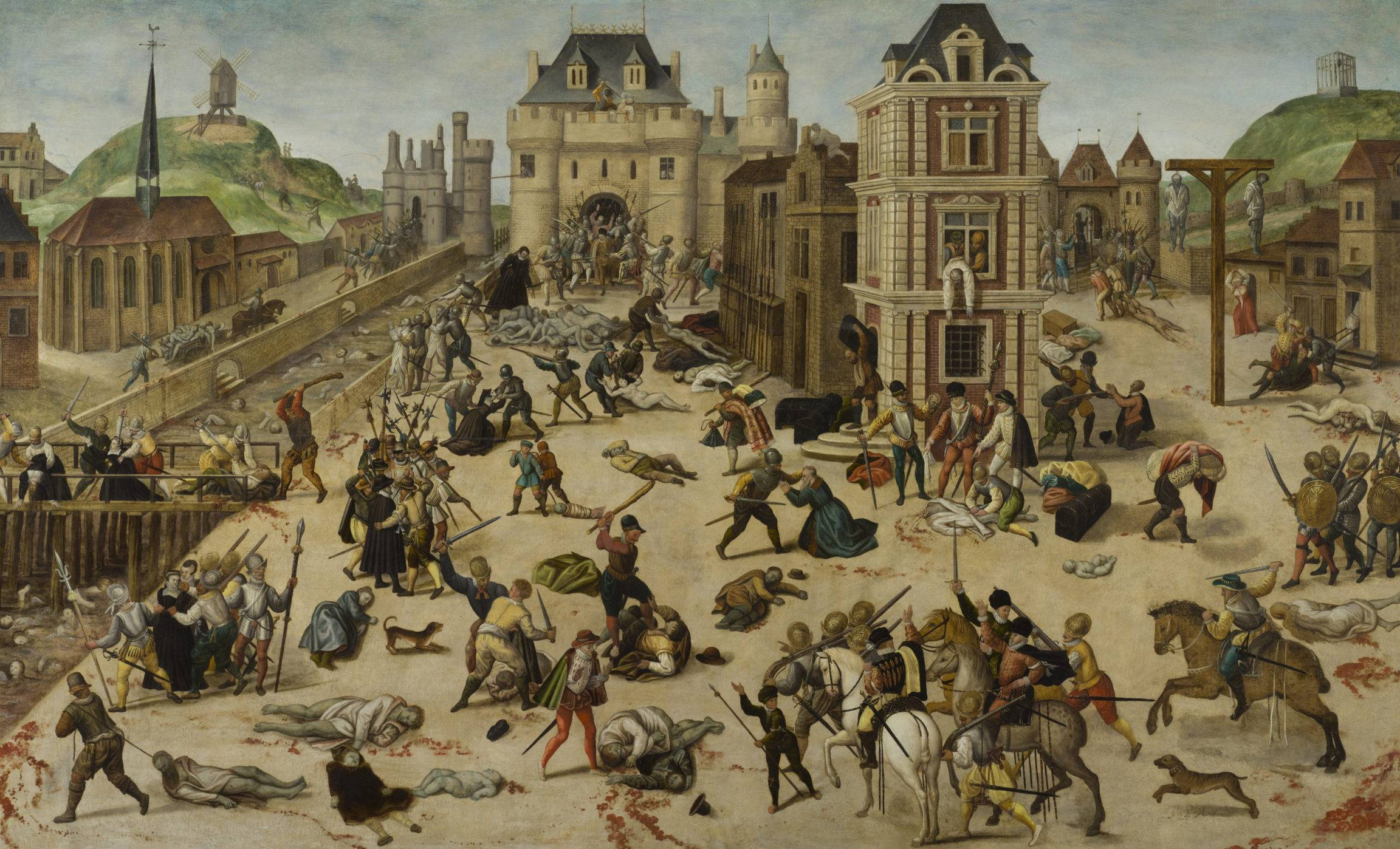
The St. Bartholomew's Day massacre of French Protestants in 1572

Peace, compassion and forgiveness of wrongs done by others are key elements of Christian teaching. However, Christians have struggled since the days of the Church fathers with the question of when the use of force is justified. Such debates have led to concepts such as just war theory. Throughout history, biblical passages have been used to justify the use of force against heretics, sinners and external enemies. Heitman and Hagan identify the Inquisitions, Crusades, wars of religion and antisemitism as being "among the most notorious examples of Christian violence". To this list, J. Denny Weaver adds, "warrior popes, support for capital punishment, corporal punishment under the guise of 'spare the rod and spoil the child', justifications of slavery, world-wide colonialism in the name of conversion to Christianity, the systemic violence of women subjected to men". Weaver employs a broader definition of violence that extends the meaning of the word to cover "harm or damage", not just physical violence per se. Thus, under his definition, Christian violence includes "forms of systemic violence such as poverty, racism, and sexism".

Christians have also engaged in violence against those who they consider heretics and non-believers. In Letter to a Christian Nation, critic of religion Sam Harris writes that "...faith inspires violence in at least two ways. First, people often kill other human beings because they believe that the creator of the universe wants them to do it... Second, far greater numbers of people fall into conflict with one another because they define their moral community on the basis of their religious affiliation..."

Christian theologians point to a strong doctrinal and historical imperative against violence which exists within Christianity, particularly Jesus' Sermon on the Mount, which taught nonviolence and love of enemies. Weaver says that Jesus' pacifism was "preserved in the justifiable war doctrine which declares that all war is sin even when it is occasionally declared to be a necessary evil, and it was also preserved in the prohibition of fighting by monastics and clergy as well as in a persistent tradition of Christian pacifism". Others point out sayings and acts of Jesus that do not fit this description: the absence of any censure of the soldier who asks Jesus to heal his servant, his overturning the tables and chasing the moneychangers from the temple with a rope in his hand, and through his Apostles, baptising a Roman Centurion who is never asked to first give up arms.

Historically, prohibitions on fighting by monastics and clerics have often been discarded; the notion of military monasticism emerged in the 12th century, in large part because of the advocacy of Bernard of Clairvaux. Bernard—and, once the papacy gave sanction to the idea, the entire Roman Catholic Church—believed that existing Christian methods of serving the Church's ends in war were inadequate, and that a group of dedicated warrior monks could achieve spiritual merit by waging war, rather than despite it. In this view, war against heretics justified means of waging war that fell outside the bounds of just war; for example, the Teutonic Order, which received papal sanction, made frequent use of massacres and violence to compel conversion during the Baltic Crusades.

=== Science ===
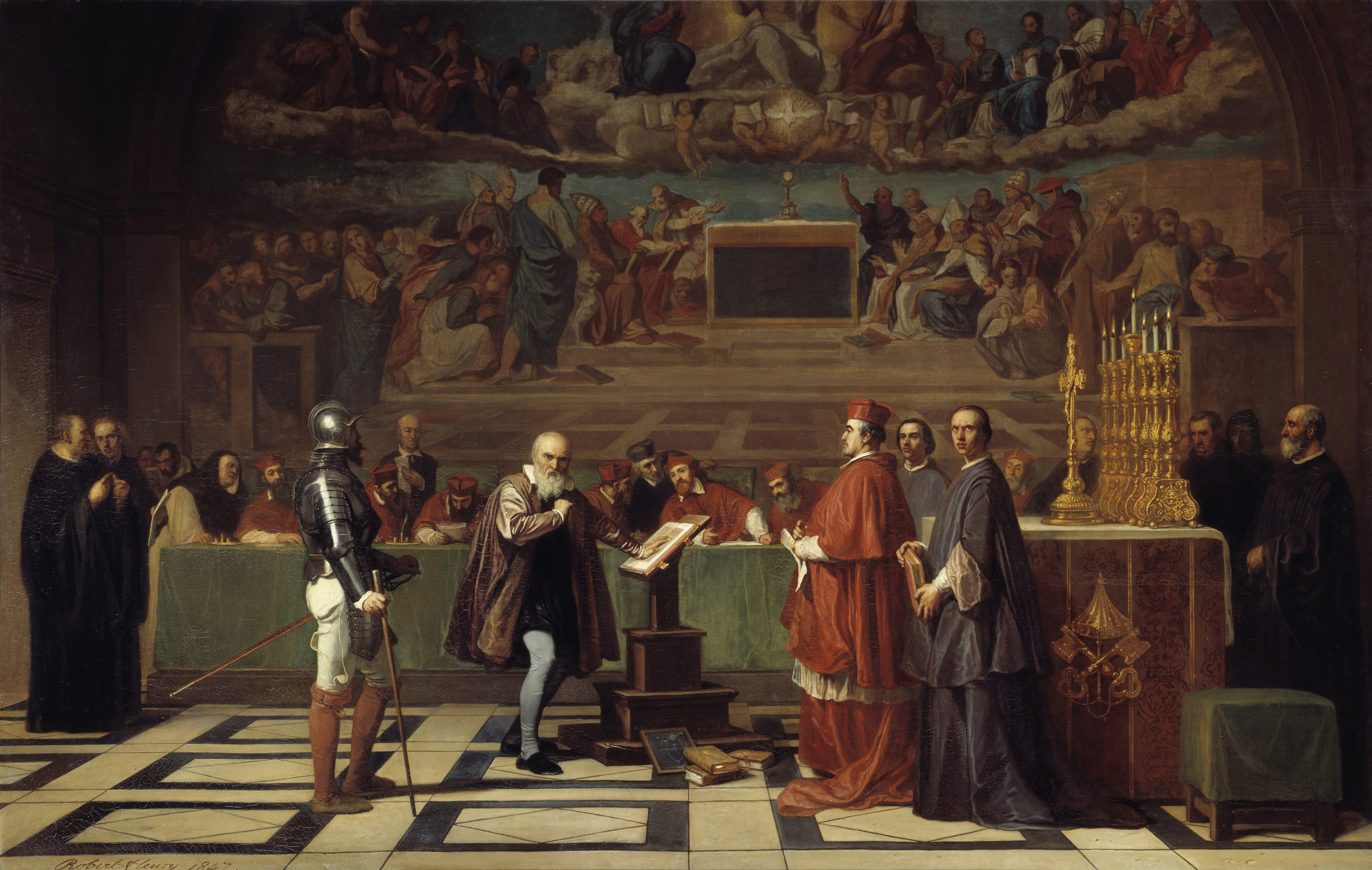
The Galileo affair as depicted by Joseph-Nicolas Robert-Fleury in Galileo before the Holy Office, 19th-century

During the 19th century an interpretive model of the relationship between religion and science known today as the conflict theory developed, according to which interaction between religion and science almost inevitably leads to hostility and conflict. A popular example was the misconception that people from the Middle Ages believed that the Earth was flat, and that only science, freed from religious dogma, had shown that it was spherical. This thesis was a popular historiographical approach during the late 19th and early 20th centuries, but most contemporary historians of science now reject it.

The notion of a war between science and religion remained common in the historiography of science during the late 19th and early 20th centuries. Most of today's historians of science consider that the conflict thesis has been superseded by subsequent historical research. The framing of the relationship between Christianity and science as being predominantly one of conflict is still prevalent in popular culture.

The astronomer Carl Sagan mentioned the dispute between the astronomical systems of Ptolemy (who thought that the Sun and planets revolved around the Earth) and Copernicus (who thought the Earth and planets revolved around the Sun). He states in Cosmos: A Personal Voyage that Ptolemy's belief was "supported by the church through the Dark Ages... [It] effectively prevented the advance of astronomy for 1,500 years." Ted Peters in Encyclopedia of Religion writes that although there is some truth in this story, it has been exaggerated and has become "a modern myth perpetuated by those wishing to see warfare between science and religion who were allegedly persecuted by an atavistic and dogma-bound ecclesiastical authority". In 1992, the Catholic Church's seeming vindication of Galileo attracted much comment in the media.

== Ethics ==
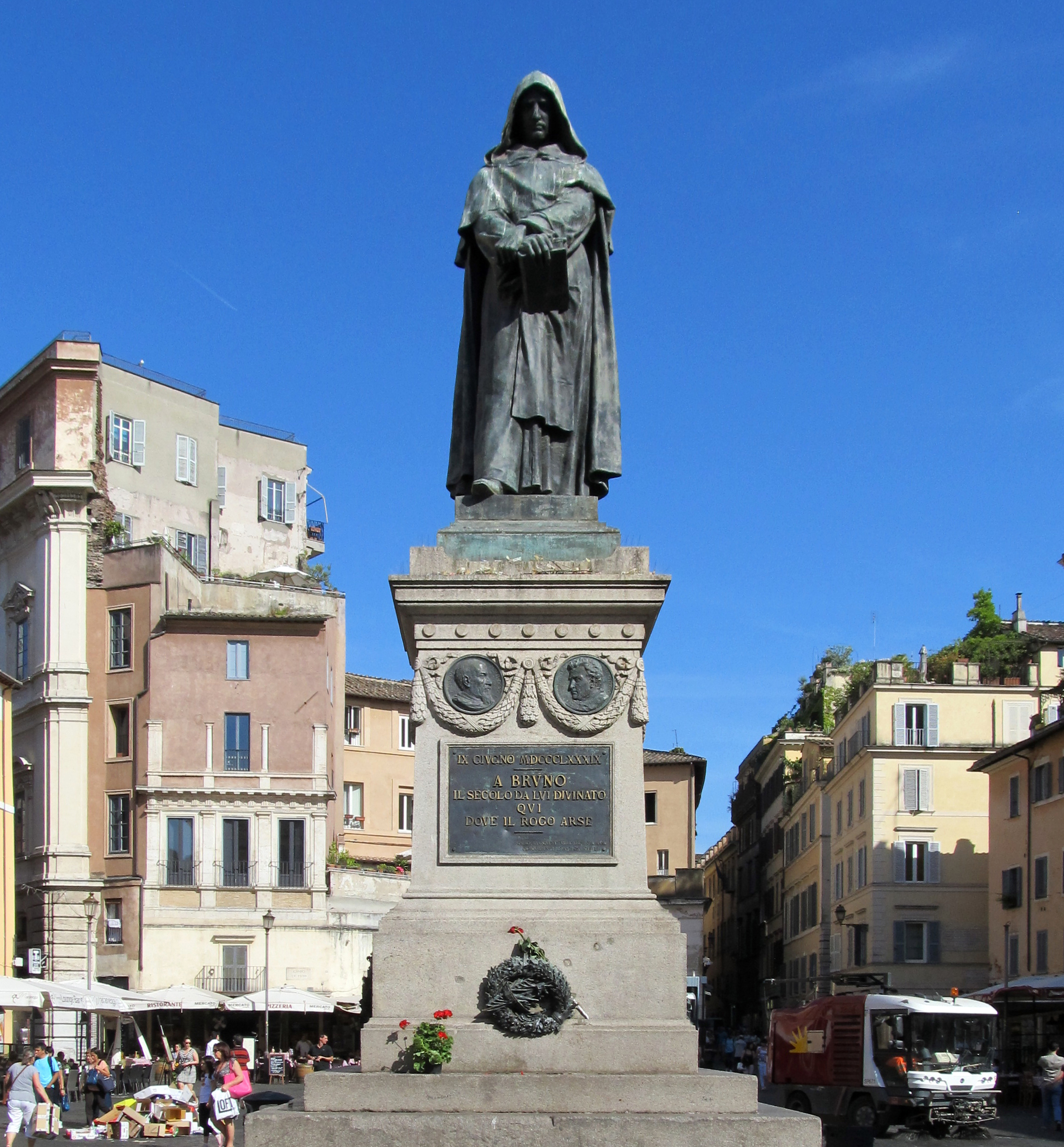
The monument to Giordano Bruno in the place he was executed in Rome

The philosopher Friedrich Nietzsche was a notable critic of the ethics of Christianity.

=== Jesus ===
Jesus is the central figure of Christianity. Since the time in which he lived, a number of noted individuals have criticised Jesus. Objects of criticism include the morality of the life of Jesus, in both his public and private lives, such as Jesus' mental health, morality of his teachings etc.

Early critics of Jesus and Christianity included Celsus in the second century and Porphyry in the third. In the 19th century, Friedrich Nietzsche was highly critical of Jesus, whose teachings he considered to be "anti-nature" in their treatment of topics such as sexuality. More contemporary notable critics of Jesus include Ayn Rand, Hector Avalos, Sita Ram Goel, Christopher Hitchens, Bertrand Russell, and Dayananda Saraswati.

=== Ethics in the Bible ===
The ethics of the Bible have been criticized by some who call some of its teachings immoral. Slavery, genocide, supersessionism, the death penalty, violence, patriarchy, sexual intolerance, colonialism, and the problem of evil and a good God, are examples of criticisms of ethics in the Bible.

The ethics in the Bible have been criticized, such as the passages in the Old Testament in which God is viewed by critics as commanding the Israelites to commit genocide against enemy peoples, and that no one among those same enemy peoples should be spared. The existence of evil has been argued as evidence of no omnipotent, omnibenevolent being, however skeptical theism suggests that humans do not have the understanding of the big picture to make an adequate assessment. However, a counter argument by Stephen Maitzen suggests that the ethical inconsistency in the Bible that is not followed by most Christians or Jews today, such as the execution of homosexuals, blasphemers, disobedient children, or the punishment for mixing linen and cloth, ultimately undermines the skeptical theism argument. Christian ethics have also been criticized for breeding intolerance (such as antisemitic views), and for having a repressive nature. Criticism has also been aimed at the threat of Hell.

=== Christianity and politics ===
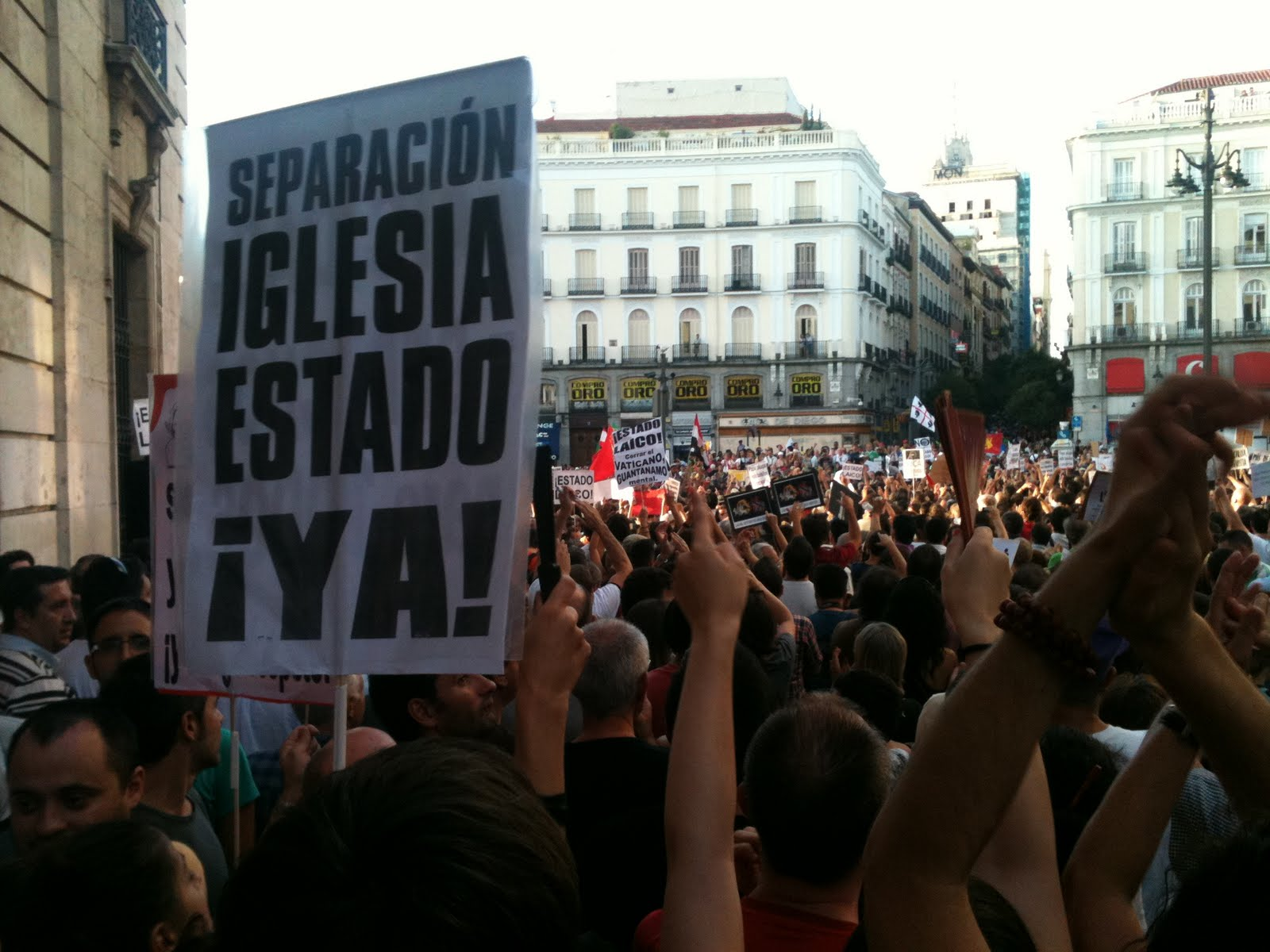
Demonstration in support of secular education, Madrid 2011

Some leftists and libertarians, including Christians who disavow the Religious Right, use the term Christian fascism or Christofascism to describe what some see as an emerging neoconservative proto-fascist or Evangelical nationalist and possibly theocratic sentiment in the United States.

==== Christian right ====
Conservative Christians are often accused of being intolerant by secular humanists and progressive Christians, who claim that they oppose science which seems to contradict their scriptural interpretation (evolution versus creationism, use of birth control, climate change denial, abortion, research into embryonic stem cells, etc.), liberal democracy (separation of church and state), and progressive social policies (rights of people of other races and religions, of women, and of people with different sexual orientations).

==== United States ====
A 2015 review of bi-yearly Gallup polls conducted since the 1970s showed that within the US, trust in organized religion had declined. Phil Zuckerman, a sociology professor, argues that political campaigning against same-sex marriage in churches "is turning off so many people from Christianity", and it is responsible for a decline in the number of Christians in the United States.

David Kinnaman, president of the Barna Institute, and Gabe Lyons of the Fermi Project published a study of the attitudes of 16- to 29-year-old Americans towards Christianity. They found that about 38% of all of those who were not regular churchgoers had negative impressions of Christianity, especially evangelical Christianity, which they associated with conservative political activism, hypocrisy, anti-homosexuality, authoritarianism, and judgmentalism. About 17% had "very bad" perceptions of Christianity.

=== Role of women ===
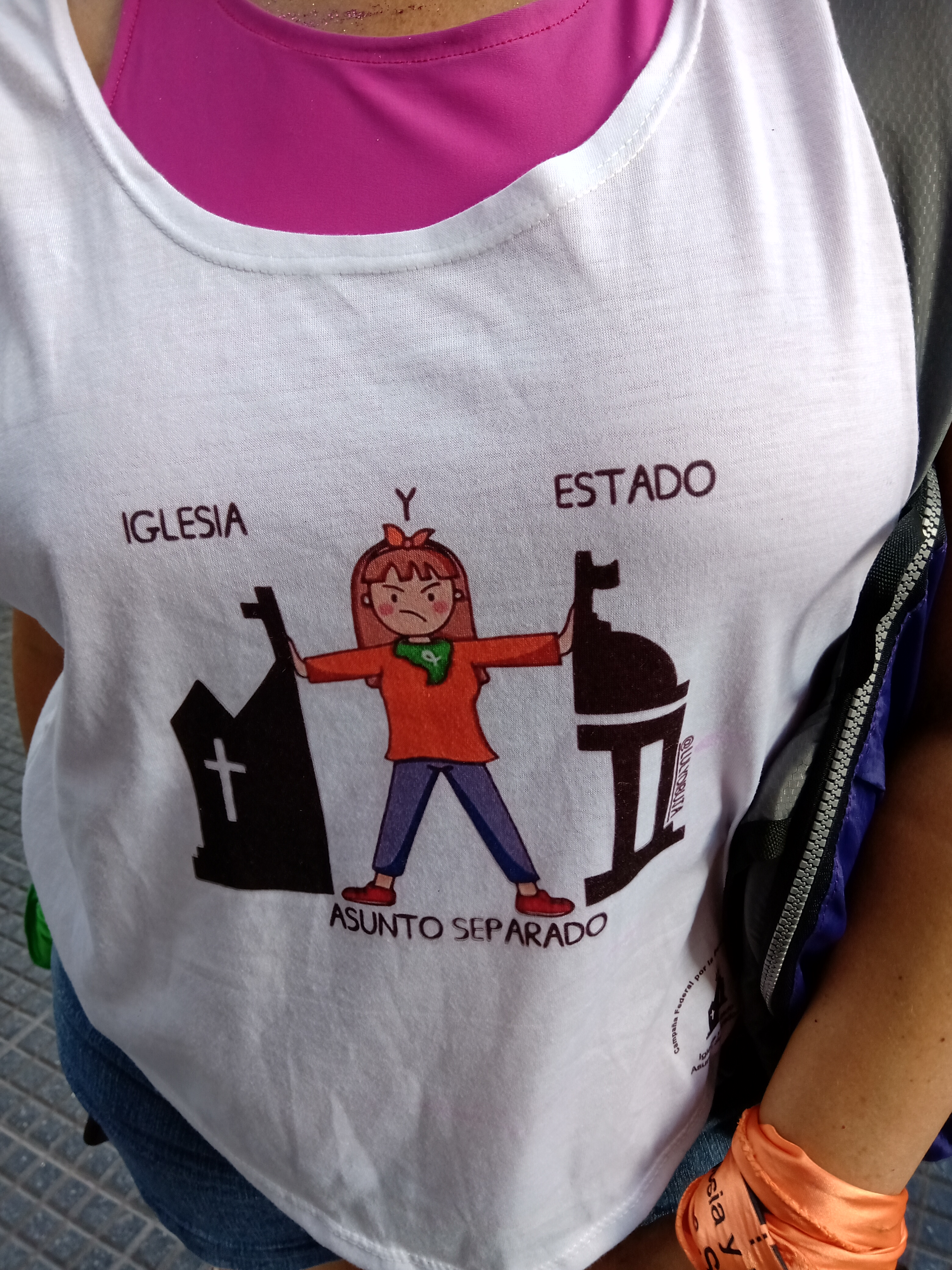
Separation of church and state. International Women's Day in Argentina, 2021.

There are three major viewpoints within modern Christianity over the role of women. They are respectively known as Christian feminism, Christian egalitarianism and complementarianism.

- Christian feminists take a feminist position from a Christian perspective.
- Christian egalitarians advocate an ability-based, rather than a gender-based, ministry of Christians of all ages, ethnicities and socio-economic classes. Egalitarians support the ordination of women and equal roles in marriage, but are theologically and morally more conservative than Christian feminists and prefer to avoid the label "feminist". A limited notion of gender complementarity is held by some, known as "complementarity without hierarchy".
- Complementarians support equality as well as the beneficial differences between men and women and how they should use their differences to cooperate.

Some Christians argue that the belief that God is a man is not based on gender; instead, they argue that the belief that God is a man is based on the tradition which existed in the dominant patriarchal society of the time in which men acted as the leaders and caretakers of their families. Thus, the idea of God as "The Father" is with regards to his relationship with what are his "children", or Christians.

Most mainline Christians claim that the doctrine of the Trinity implies that God should be called "father" rather than "mother", in the same way that Jesus was a man rather than a woman. In various accounts in the gospels, Jesus tells his followers to: address God as Father; to be merciful as their heavenly Father is merciful; that the Father will give the Holy Spirit to those who ask; and that the spirit of their Father will speak through them in times of persecution. On Easter Sunday, Jesus directs Mary Magdalene to tell the other disciples, "I am going to my Father and your Father...."

Mark Brumley points out that behind the New Testament language of divine adoption and regeneration is the concept that God is considered a father because he is the "source" or "origin" of the new life in Christ. Brumley claims that the analogy with earthly fatherhood is obvious. Among Christians who hold to this idea, there is a distinct sense that Jesus' treatment of women should imply their equality in leadership and marital roles every bit as strongly as the definite male gender of Jesus should imply the title of "father" for God. Instead of characterizing alternative naming as antifeminist, they characterize it as unnecessary and unsupported by the words which are found in the Bible.

In 2000, the Southern Baptist Convention voted to revise its "Baptist Faith and Message" (Statement of Faith), opposing women as pastors. While this decision is not binding and would not prevent women from serving as pastors, the revision itself has been criticized by some from within the convention. In the same document, the Southern Baptist Convention took a strong position of the subordinating view of woman in marriage: "A wife is to submit herself graciously to the servant leadership of her husband. She has the God-given responsibility to respect her husband and to serve as his helper in managing the household and nurturing the next generation." (Emphasis added)

The Eastern Orthodox Church does not allow the ordination of female clergy. On the other hand, the Chaldean Catholic Church continues to maintain a large number of deaconesses who serve alongside male deacons during mass. In some evangelical churches, it is forbidden for women to become pastors, deacons or church elders. In support of such prohibitions, the verse 1 Timothy 2:12 is often cited:

But I suffer not a woman to teach, nor to usurp authority over the man, but to be in silence.

== Doctrine ==
=== Miracles ===
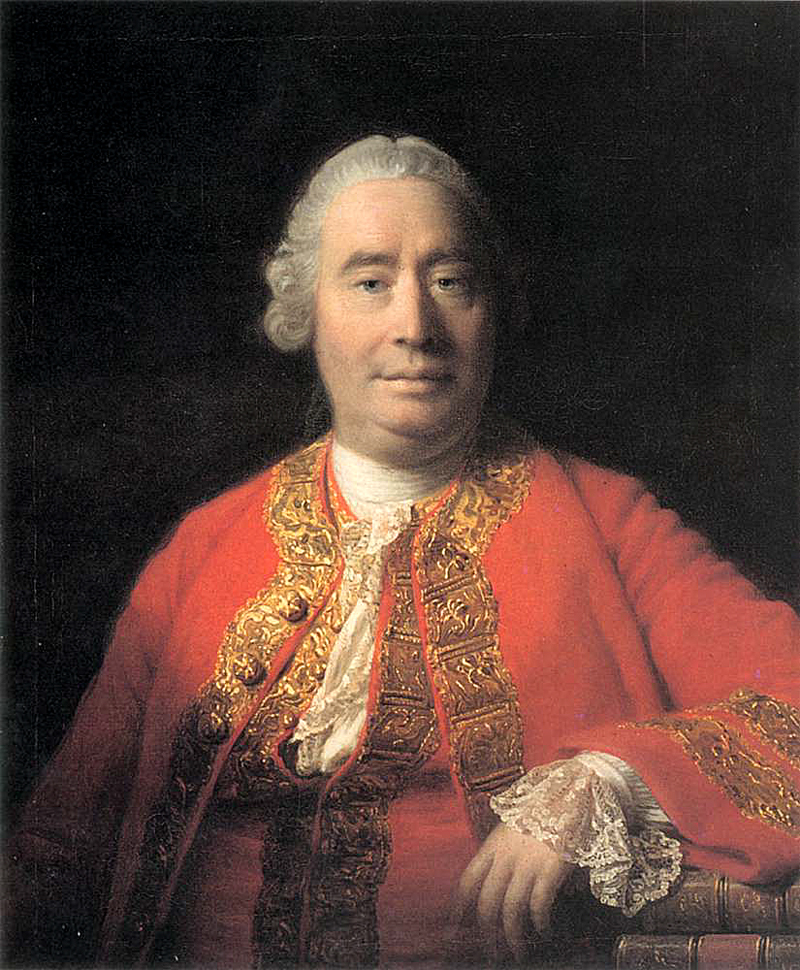
David Hume's work Of Miracles argues against the existence of miracles.

Philosopher David Hume argued against the plausibility of miracles:

1) A miracle is a violation of the known laws of nature;
2) We know these laws through repeated and constant experience;
3) The testimony of those who report miracles contradicts the operation of known scientific laws;
4) Consequently no one can rationally believe in miracles.

The Roman Catholic Church and the Eastern Orthodox Church reject Hume's argument against miracles outright with the teachings of St. Gregory Palamas, who postulated that reason alone was not sufficient to understand God's energies (activities such as miracles) and essence, but faith was.

Miraculous healings through prayers, often involving the "laying on of hands", have been reported. However, reliance on faith healing alone can indirectly contribute to serious harm and even death. Christian apologists including C.S. Lewis, Norman Geisler and William Lane Craig have argued that miracles are reasonable and plausible.

=== Incarnation ===
Celsus found it hard to reconcile the Christian human God, who was born and matured, with the Jewish God, who was supposed to be one and unchanging. He asked "if God wanted to reform humanity, why did he choose to descend and live on earth? How his brief presence in Jerusalem could benefit all the millions of people who lived elsewhere in the world or who had lived and died before his incarnation?"

One classical response is Lewis's trilemma, a syllogism popularised by C. S. Lewis that intended to demonstrate the logical inconsistency of both holding Jesus of Nazareth to be a "great moral teacher" while also denying his divinity. The logical soundness of this trilemma has been widely questioned.

=== Hell and damnation ===
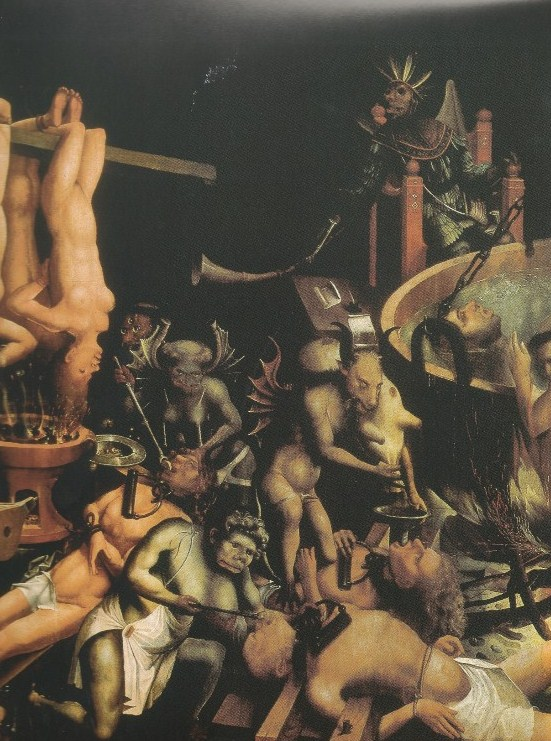
A detail from Hieronymous Bosch's depiction of Hell

Christianity has been criticized as seeking to persuade people into accepting its authority through simple fear of punishment or, conversely, through hope of reward after death, rather than through rational argumentation or empirical evidence. Traditional Christian doctrine dictates that, without faith in Jesus Christ or in the Christian faith in general, one is subject to eternal damnation in Hell.

Critics regard the eternal punishment of those who fail to adopt Christian faith as morally objectionable, and consider it an abhorrent picture of the nature of the world. On a similar theme objections are made against the perceived injustice of punishing a person for all eternity for a temporal crime. Some Christians agree (see Annihilationism and Christian Universalism). These beliefs have been considered especially repugnant when the claimed omniscient and omnipotent God makes, or allows a person to come into existence, with a nature that desires that which God finds objectionable.

In the Abrahamic religions, Hell has traditionally been regarded as a punishment for wrongdoing or sin in this life, as a manifestation of divine justice. As in the problem of evil, some apologists argue that the torments of Hell are attributable not to a defect in God's benevolence, but in human free will. Although a benevolent God would prefer to see everyone saved, he would also allow humans to control their own destinies. This view opens the possibility of seeing Hell not as retributive punishment, but rather as an option that God allows, so that people who do not wish to be with God are not forced to be. C. S. Lewis most famously proposed this view in his book The Great Divorce, saying: "There are only two kinds of people in the end: those who say to God, 'Thy will be done,' and those to whom God says, in the end, 'Thy will be done.'"

Hell is not seen as strictly a matter of retributive justice even by the more traditionalist churches. For example, the Eastern Orthodox see it as a condition brought about by, and the natural consequence of, free rejection of God's love. The Roman Catholic Church teaches that hell is a place of punishment brought about by a person's self-exclusion from communion with God. In some ancient Eastern Orthodox traditions, Hell and Heaven are distinguished not spatially, but by the relation of a person to God's love.

Some modern critics of the doctrine of Hell (such as Marilyn McCord Adams) claim that, even if Hell is seen as a choice rather than as punishment, it would be unreasonable for God to give such flawed and ignorant creatures as humans the awesome responsibility of their eternal destinies. Jonathan Kvanvig, in his book, The Problem of Hell, agrees that God would not allow one to be eternally damned by a decision made under the wrong circumstances. For instance, one should not always honor the choices of human beings, even when they are full adults, if, for instance, the choice is made while depressed or careless. On Kvanvig's view, God will abandon no person until they have made a settled, final decision, under favorable circumstances, to reject God, but God will respect a choice made under the right circumstances. Once a person finally and competently chooses to reject God, out of respect for the person's autonomy, God allows them to be annihilated.

=== Idolatry ===
Christians have sometimes been accused of idolatry, especially with regard to the iconoclastic controversy. However, Orthodox Christians and Roman Catholics forbid the worship of icons and relics as divine in and of themselves, while honouring those represented by them is accepted and philosophically justified by the Second Council of Constantinople. Jewish theologians often considered Christianity to be a form of idolatry due to its doctrines of the Trinity (which teaches that God is more than one person) and the incarnation (which teaches that God became man); notably, the famous medieval Jewish writer Maimonides considered Christianity to be a form of polytheism.

=== Limbo ===
The Roman Catholic Church teaches that baptism is a necessity for salvation. In the 5th century, Augustine of Hippo concluded that infants who die without baptism were consigned to hell. By the 13th century, theologians referred to the "limbo of infants" as a place where unbaptized babies were deprived of the vision of God, but did not suffer because they did not know of that which they were deprived, and moreover enjoyed perfect natural happiness. The 1983 Code of Canon Law (1183 §2) specifies that "Children whose parents had intended to have them baptized but who died before baptism, may be allowed church funeral rites by the local ordinary". In 2007, the 30-member International Theological Commission revisited the concept of limbo. However, the commission also said that hopefulness was not the same as certainty about the destiny of such infants. Rather, as stated in the Catechism of the Catholic Church, 1257, "God has bound salvation to the sacrament of Baptism, but he himself is not bound by his sacraments." Hope in the mercy of God is not the same as certainty through the sacraments, but it is not without result, as demonstrated in Jesus' statement to the thief on the cross in Luke 23:42–43.

The concept of limbo is not accepted by the Orthodox Church or by Protestants.

=== Atonement ===
The idea of atonement for sin is criticized by Richard Dawkins on the grounds that the image of God as requiring the suffering and death of Jesus to effect reconciliation with humankind is immoral. The view is summarized by Dawkins: "if God wanted to forgive our sins, why not just forgive them? Who is God trying to impress?" Oxford theologian Alister McGrath maintains that Dawkins is "ignorant" of Christian theology, and therefore unable to engage religion and faith intelligently. He goes on to say that the atonement was necessary because of our flawed human nature, which made it impossible for humans to save themselves, and that it expresses God's love for mankind by removing the sin that stands in the way of human reconciliation with God. Responding to the criticism that he is "ignorant" of theology, Dawkins asks, "Do you have to read up on leprechology before disbelieving in leprechauns?" and "[y]es, I have, of course, met this point before. It sounds superficially fair. But it presupposes that there is something in Christian theology to be ignorant about. The entire thrust of my position is that Christian theology is a non-subject." Dinesh D'Souza says that Dawkins' criticism "only makes sense if you assume Christians made the whole thing up." He goes on to say that Christians view it as a beautiful sacrifice, and that "through the extremity of Golgotha, Christ reconciles divine justice and divine mercy." Andrew Wilson argues that Dawkins misses the point of the atonement, which has nothing to do with masochism, but is based on the concepts of holiness, sin and grace.

Robert Green Ingersoll suggests that the concept of the atonement is simply an extension of the Mosaic tradition of blood sacrifice and "is the enemy of morality". The death of Jesus Christ represents the blood sacrifice to end all blood sacrifices; the resulting mechanism of atonement by proxy through that final sacrifice has appeal as a more convenient and much less costly approach to redemption than repeated animal sacrifice—a common sense solution to the problem of reinterpreting ancient religious approaches based on sacrifice.

The prominent Christian apologist Josh McDowell, in More Than A Carpenter, addresses the issue through an analogy of a real-life judge in California who was forced to fine his daughter $100 for speeding, but then came down, took off his robe, and paid the fine for her from his billfold, though as in this and other cases, illustrations are only cautiously intended to describe certain aspects of the atonement and not in its entirety.

=== Second Coming ===
Jesus in the Gospel of Mark and Matthew appears to promise for his followers the return of the son of man was to happen before the generation he is preaching to vanishes. Some scholars see these predictions as mistaken, while many others view it from the perspective of the conditional nature of judgement prophecy.

However, Preterists argue that Jesus did not mean his second coming but speaks about demonstrations of his might, formulating this as "coming in his kingdom", especially the destruction of the Second Temple in the Siege of Jerusalem in 70 AD, which he foretold, and by which time not all of his disciples were still living. According to this view Matthew 10:23 should be understood in the same way.

=== Inconsistency with regard to the Old Testament's conception of the afterlife ===
Most Christian traditions teach belief in life after death as a central and indispensable tenet of their faith. Critics argue that the Christian conception of the afterlife is inconsistent with that of the Hebrew Bible. George E. Mendenhall believes there is no concept of immortality or life after death in the Hebrew Bible. The presumption is that the deceased are inert, lifeless, and engaging in no activity.

The concept of Sheol (Hebrew: שְׁאוֹל), or a state of nothingness, was shared among Babylonian and Israelite beliefs. "Sheol, as it was called by the ancient Israelites, is the land of no return, lying below the cosmic ocean, to which all, the mighty and the weak, travel in the ghostly form they assume after death, known as Rephaim. There the dead have no experience of either joy or pain, perceiving no light, feeling no movement." Obayashi concludes that the Israelites were satisfied with such a shadowy realm of afterlife because they were more deeply concerned with survival.

Before the early Christian split from mainstream Judaism in the 1st century, the belief in an afterlife was already prevalent in Jewish thinking (Note: See Jewish eschatology § Olam Haba - the afterlife and the world to come) among the Pharisees (Note: See Pharisees § Pharisaic principles and values) and Essenes (Note: See Essenes § Rules, customs, theology and beliefs). The themes of unity and Sheol, which largely shaped the ancient tradition of Judaism, had been undermined when only the most pious of Jews were massacred during the Maccabean revolt.

== Criticism of Christians ==
=== Hypocrisy ===
Gaudium et spes claims that the example of Christians may be a contributory factor to atheism, writing, "...believers can have more than a little to do with the birth of atheism. To the extent that they neglect their own training in the faith, or teach erroneous doctrine, or are deficient in their religious, moral, or social life, they must be said to conceal rather than reveal the authentic face of God and religion."

Secular and religious critics have accused many Christians of being hypocritical. Tom Whiteman, a Philadelphia psychologist found that the primary reasons for Christian divorce include adultery, abuse (including substance, physical and verbal abuse), and abandonment whereas the number one reason cited for divorce in the general population was incompatibility.

=== Sectarianism ===
Some have argued that Christianity is undermined by the inability of Christians to agree on matters of faith and church governance, and the tendency for the content of their faith to be determined by regional or political factors. Schopenhauer sarcastically suggested:

To the South German ecclesiastic the truth of the Catholic dogma is quite obvious, to the North German, the Protestant. If then, these convictions are based on objective reasons, the reasons must be climatic, and thrive, like plants, some only here, some only there. The convictions of those who are thus locally convinced are taken on trust and believed by the masses everywhere.

Certain Christians respond that ecumenism has helped bring together such communities, where in the past mistranslations of Christological Greek terms may have resulted in seemingly different views. Non-denominational Christianity represents another approach towards reducing the divisions within Christianity, although many Christian groups claiming to be non-denominational wind up with similar problems.

=== Persecution by Christians ===
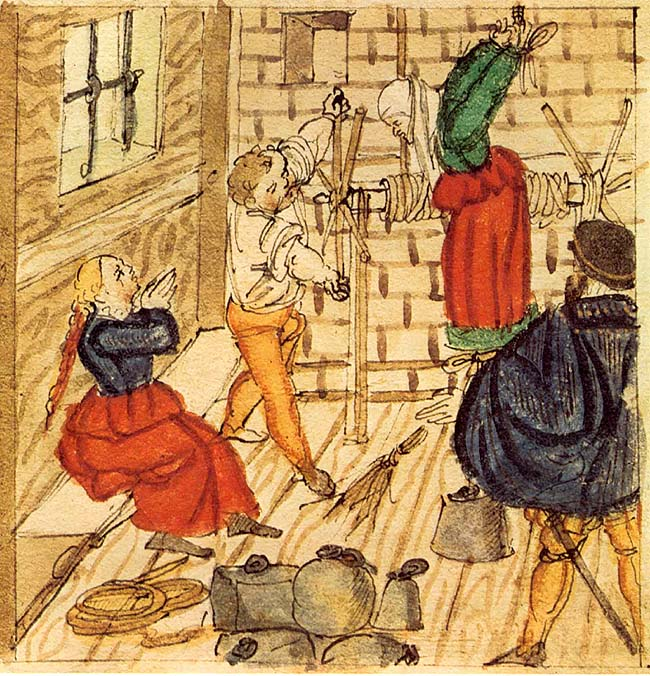
The torture used against accused witches, 1577

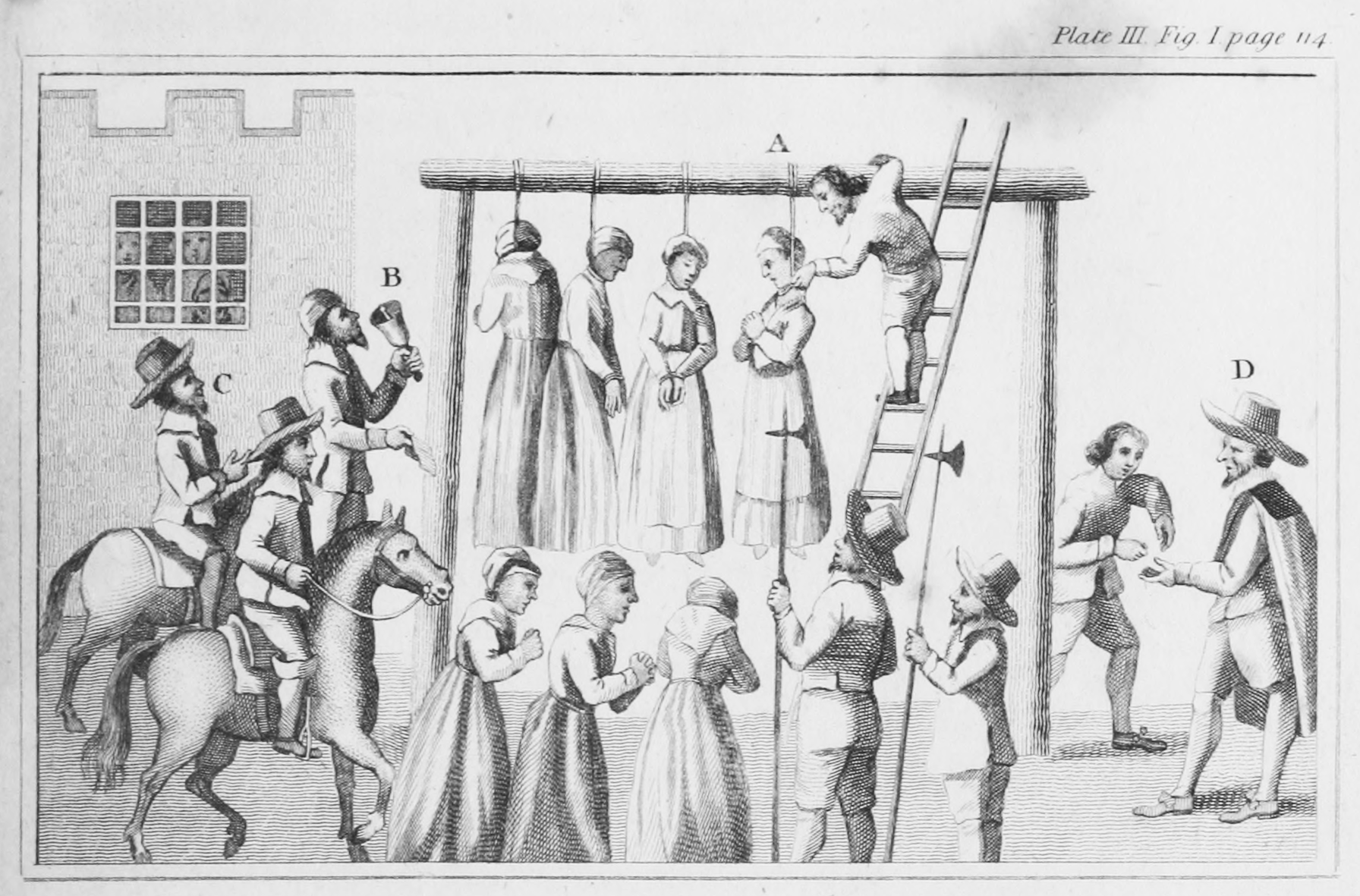
Women being hanged for witchcraft after a witch hunt, Newcastle upon Tyne, 1655

Individuals and groups throughout history have been persecuted by certain Christians (and Christian groups) based upon sex, sexual orientation, race, and religion (even within the bounds of Christianity itself). Many of the persecutors attempted to justify their actions with particular scriptural interpretations. During Late Antiquity and the Middle Ages, important Christian theologians advocated religious persecution to varying degrees. However, early modern Europe witnessed a turning point in the Christian debate on persecution and toleration. Nowadays all significant Christian denominations embrace religious toleration, and "look back on centuries of persecution with a mixture of revulsion and incomprehension".

Early Christianity was a minority religion in the Roman Empire and the early Christians were themselves persecuted during that time. After Constantine I converted to Christianity, it became the dominant religion in the Roman Empire. Already under the reign of Constantine I, Christian heretics had been persecuted; beginning in the late 4th century AD also the ancient pagan religions were actively suppressed. In the view of many historians, the Constantinian shift turned Christianity from a persecuted into a persecuting religion.

After the decline of the Roman Empire, the further Christianization of Europe was to a large extent peaceful. However, encounters between Christians and Pagans were sometimes confrontational, and some Christian kings (Charlemagne, Olaf I of Norway) were known for their violence against pagans. In the late Middle Ages, the appearance of the Cathars and Bogomils in Europe laid the stage for the later witch hunts. These (probably gnostic-influenced) sects were seen as heretics by the Roman Catholic Church, and the Inquisition was established to counter them. In the case of the Cathars, the Albigensian Crusade violently suppressed them. In the Baltic countries, pagans were killed, subjugated or forcibly baptized.

From the start of Christian rule in Europe, Jews were increasingly discriminated against, at times rising to outright persecution. This sometimes took the form of events like the Rhineland massacres, and the blood libel was often the source (claiming Jews ritually murdered Christian children). Jews were also expelled from a number of countries, including from England and later Spain. In the latter case, if converted they could remain. However, as most did so only under duress, Judaism continued to be practiced in secret by many. As a result, the Spanish Inquisition was formed to root them out, along with the secret Muslims there. In the First Crusade, after the Siege of Jerusalem, all Jews and Muslims within the city were massacred by the Crusaders.

After the Protestant Reformation, the devastation caused by the partly religiously motivated wars (Thirty Years' War, English Civil War, French Wars of Religion) in Europe in the 17th century gave rise to the ideas of religious toleration, freedom of religion and religious pluralism.

=== Christianity in Nazi Germany ===
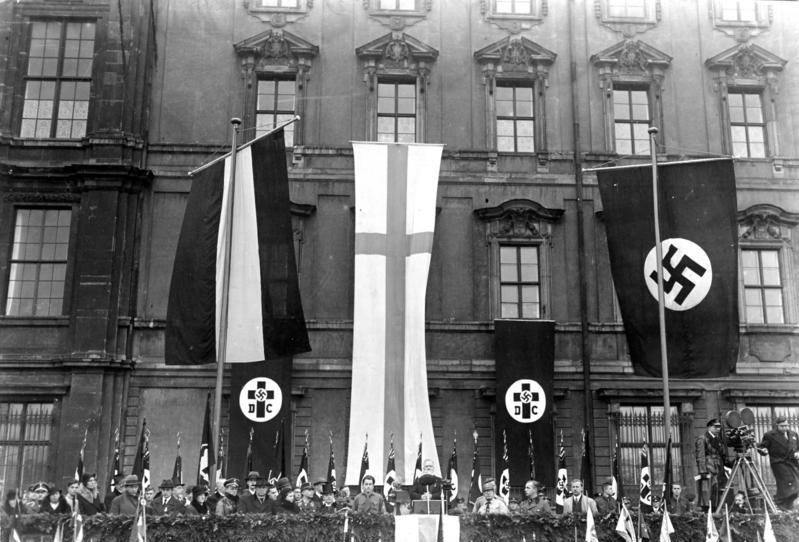
German Christians celebrating Luther-Day in Berlin in 1933

Adolf Hitler's 1920 Nazi Party Platform promoted Positive Christianity—which mixed ideas of racial purity and Nazi ideology with elements of Christianity and removed "Jewish" elements.

Nazism aimed to transform the subjective consciousness of the German people—their attitudes, values and mentalities—into a single-minded, obedient "national community". The Nazis believed they would therefore have to replace class, religious and regional allegiances. Under the Gleichschaltung process, Hitler attempted to create a unified Protestant Reich Church from Germany's 28 existing Protestant churches. The plan failed, and was resisted by the Confessing Church. Persecution of the Catholic Church in Germany followed the Nazi takeover. Hitler moved quickly to eliminate political catholicism. Amid harassment of the Church, the Reich concordat treaty with the Vatican was signed in 1933, and promised to respect Church autonomy. Hitler routinely disregarded the Concordat, closing all Catholic institutions whose functions were not strictly religious. Clergy, nuns, and lay leaders were targeted, with thousands of arrests over the ensuing years.

Hitler was supportive of Christianity in public, yet hostile to it in private. Anti-clericalists like Joseph Goebbels and Martin Bormann saw the conflict with the Churches as a priority concern, and anti-church and anti-clerical sentiments were strong among grassroots party activists. Hitler was born to a practising Roman Catholic mother and an anticlerical father, but after leaving home Hitler never again attended Mass or received the sacraments. According to biographer Alan Bullock, Hitler retained some regard for the organisational power of Catholicism but held private contempt for its central teachings, which he said, if taken to their conclusion, "would mean the systematic cultivation of the human failure."

Joseph Goebbels, the Reich Minister of Propaganda, used his position to widely publicise trials of clergy and nuns in his propaganda campaigns, showing the cases in the worst possible light. In 1928, soon after his election to the Reichstag, Goebbels wrote in his diary that National Socialism was a "religion" that needed a genius to uproot "outmoded religious practices" and put new ones in their place: "One day soon National Socialism will be the religion of all Germans. My Party is my church, and I believe I serve the Lord best if I do his will, and liberate my oppressed people from the fetters of slavery. That is my gospel." As the war progressed, on the "Church Question", he wrote "after the war it has to be generally solved... There is, namely, an insoluble opposition between the Christian and a heroic-German world view".

Hitler's chosen deputy and private secretary, Martin Bormann, was a rigid guardian of National Socialist orthodoxy and saw Christianity and Nazism as "incompatible" (mainly because of its Jewish origins), as did the official Nazi philosopher, Alfred Rosenberg. In his "Myth of the Twentieth Century" (1930), Rosenberg wrote that the main enemies of the Germans were the "Russian Tartars" and "Semites"—with "Semites" including Christians, especially the Roman Catholic Church.

According to Bullock, Hitler considered the Protestant clergy to be "insignificant" and "submissive" and lacking in a religion to be taken seriously. Hitler attempted to create a unified Protestant Reich Church from 28 separate regional churches through Gleichschaltung. His bid to create a unified Reich Church ultimately failed, and Hitler became disinterested in supporting the so-called "German Christians" Nazi aligned movement. Hitler initially lent support to Ludwig Müller, a Nazi and former naval chaplain, to serve as Reich Bishop, but his heretical views against Paul the Apostle and the Semitic origins of Christ and the Bible (see Positive Christianity) quickly alienated sections of the Protestant church. Lutheran Pastor Martin Niemöller created the Confessing Church movement to oppose the Nazification of Protestant churches. Neimoller was arrested by the Gestapo in 1937, and sent to the concentration camps. The Confessing Church seminary was prohibited that same year.

=== Christian persecution complex ===
Christian persecution complex is the notion that Christian values and Christians are being oppressed by social groups and governments. According to Elizabeth Castelli, some set the starting point in the middle of the 20th century while others point to the 1990s. After the September 11 attacks, it accelerated. The concept that Christianity is being oppressed is popular among conservative politicians in contemporary politics in the United States, and they utilize this idea to address issues concerning LGBT people or the ACA's Contraceptives Mandate, which they perceive as an attack on Christianity.

Others (like professor Candida Moss and lecturer Paul Cavill) point out that this mentality of being persecuted roots back to the earliest times. It appeared during the era of early Christianity due to internal Christian identity politics. Cavill claims that the New Testament teaches that persecutions are inherent to Christianity.

== Criticism by other religions ==
=== Hinduism ===
Ram Mohan Roy criticized Christian doctrines and asserted that they are "unreasonable" and "self-contradictory". He further added that people (even from India) were embracing Christianity due to the economic hardship and weakness, just like European Jews were pressured to embrace Christianity by both encouragement and force.

Vivekananda regarded Christianity as "collection of little bits of Indian thought. Ours is the religion of which Buddhism with all its greatness is a rebel child, and of which Christianity is a very patchy imitation".

Philosopher Dayanand Saraswati regarded Christianity as a "barbarous" and "false" religion believed only by "fools" and by the people in a "state of barbarism". He said that the Bible contains many stories and precepts that are "immoral, praising cruelty, deceit and encouraging sin".

In 1956 the Niyogi Committee Report On Christian Missionary Activities was published by the Government of Madhya Pradesh. This influential report on controversial missionary activities in India recommended that suitable controls on conversions brought about through illegal means should be implemented. Also in the 1950s, K.M. Panikkar's work "Asia and Western Dominance" was published and was one of the first post-Independence Indian critiques of Christian missions. It argued that the attempt to convert Asia has definitely failed, and that this failure was due to the missionaries' claim of a monopoly of truth which was alien to the Asian mind, their association with imperialism and the attitude of moral and racial superiority of the Christian West.

The Indian writer and philosopher Ram Swarup was "most responsible for reviving and re-popularizing" the Hindu critique of Christian missionary practices in the 1980s. He insisted that monotheistic religions like Christianity "nurtured among their adherents a lack of respect for other religions". Other important writers who criticized Christianity from an Indian and Hindu perspective include Sita Ram Goel and Arun Shourie. Arun Shourie urged Hindus to be "alert to the fact that missionaries have but one goal—that of harvesting us for the church"; and he wrote that they have "developed a very well-knit, powerful, extremely well-endowed organizational framework" for attaining that goal. In his "widely read and cited" book Missionaries in India, Shourie tried to build a case that Christian evangelistic methods were cynically calculating and materialistic, and to Shourie, missionary strategizing "sounded more like the Planning Commission, if not the Pentagon, than like Jesus".

The Indian philosopher and statesman Sarvepalli Radhakrishnan wrote:

Unfortunately Christian religion inherited the Semitic creed of the 'jealous God' in the view of Christ as 'the only begotten son of God' so could not brook any rival near the throne. When Europe accepted the Christian religion, in spite of its own broad humanism, it accepted the fierce intolerance which is the natural result of belief in 'the truth once for all delivered to the saints.'

=== Judaism ===
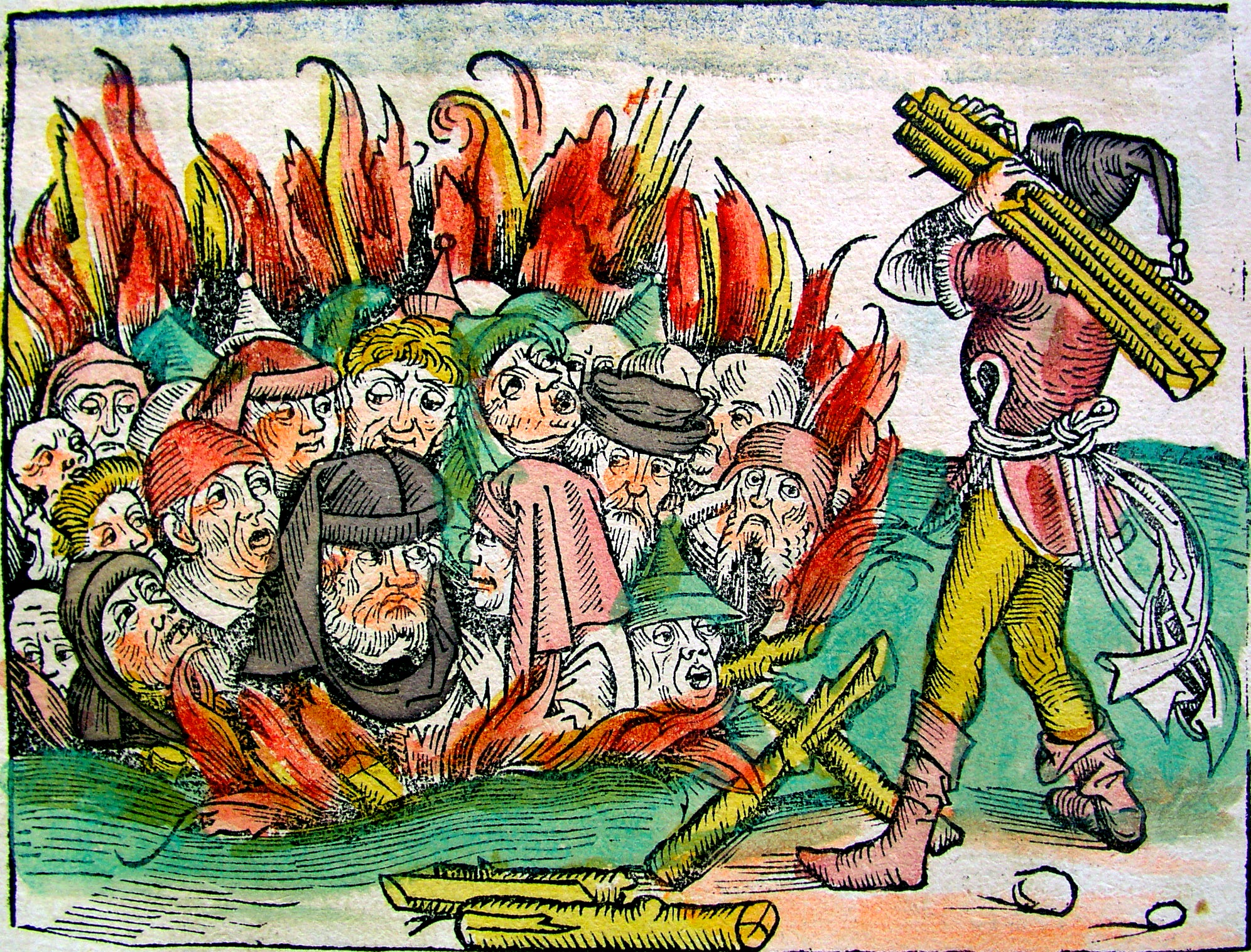
Jews burned alive for the alleged host desecration in Bavaria, in 1337

According to Judaism, Jesus did not fulfill the prophecies of the Hebrew Bible and was neither the awaited Messiah nor the son of God.

Shlomo ben Aderet called Christianity a lesser form of monotheism that lacks the unified deity of Judaism. Also in the Middle Ages, Maimonides considered Christianity to be a prime example of idolatrous heresy.

David Flusser viewed Christianity as "cheaper Judaism" and highly anti-Jewish. He also regarded the "failure of Christianity to convert the Jewish people to the new message" as "precisely the reason for the strong anti-Jewish trend in Christianity."

Stephen Samuel Wise criticized the Christian community for its failure to rescue Jews from Europe during Nazi rule. He wrote that:

A Christian world that will permit millions of Jews to be slain without moving heaven by prayer and earth in every human way to save its Jews has lost its capacity for moral and spiritual survival.

=== Islam ===
Muslim scholars have criticized Christianity, usually for its trinity concept. They argue that this doctrine is an invention, distortion of the idea about God, and presentation of the idea that there are three gods, a form of shirk, or polytheism. According to Qu'ran 9:31, Christians should follow one God, but they have made multiple.

They have taken as lords beside Allah their rabbis and their monks and the Messiah son of Mary, when they were bidden to worship only One God.

In modern times, some Muslim scholars have continued to critique Christianity. For example, in his work Christian Ethics: A Historical and Systematic Analysis of Its Dominant Ideas (1967), the late Isma'il Raji al-Faruqi, who was a professor at Temple University, argued that Christianity has incorporated various influences that diverge from Jesus' original teachings. This critique emphasizes what he saw as the need for a rational and coherent ethical framework, contrasting Christian concepts like peccatism (inherent human sinfulness) and saviorism (belief in Jesus as the redeemer) with Islamic views. This perspective includes a critique of Christian theological paradoxes and advocates for what al-Faruqi considered a rational and coherent ethical framework.

== See also ==
- Anti-Catholicism
- Anti-Christian sentiment
- Anti-clericalism
- Anti-Mormonism
- Anti-Protestantism
- The Bible and violence
- Christian fundamentalism
- Christian terrorism
- Christianity and Theosophy
- Criticism of Jesus
- Apostasy in Christianity
- Criticism of the Bible
- Christian feminism
- Christ myth theory
- History of Christian thought on persecution and tolerance
- Internal consistency of the Bible
- Criticism of Protestantism
- Criticism of the Catholic Church
- Persecution of Christians
- Sectarian violence among Christians
