= Jennifer Knust =

American biblical scholar

- Jennifer Wright Knust
- Born: 20th century
- Scientific career
- Fields: New Testament and early Christian history
- Institutions: College of the Holy Cross, Duke University, Boston University College of Arts and Sciences

Jennifer W. Knust is a professor of religious studies at Duke University, who holds an affiliate appointment in the Department of Classical Studies. Since 2020, she has been director of undergraduate studies in the department of religious studies, director of the Elizabeth A. Clark Center for Late Ancient Studies, and Co-Director of the Manuscript Migration Lab at the Franklin Humanities Institute, all at Duke University. Knust has written about the importance of gendered discourses to the production of an early Christian identity.

== Biography ==
Knust earned a bachelor's degree in psychology from the University of Illinois Urbana-Champaign in 1988. She then obtained a Master of Divinity degree from Union Theological Seminary, as well as a master's degree of philosophy and Doctor of Philosophy in religious studies from Columbia University in 1997 and 2001, respectively. Previously, Knust was an associate professor of religious studies at the College of Arts and Sciences, and an associate professor at the school of theology, Boston University. She also had affiliate appointments in women's, gender, and sexuality studies, the Elie Wiesel Center for Judaic Studies, and the department of classical studies.

Knust received an ACLS Frederick Burkhardt Residential Fellowship and was in residence at the American Academy in Rome. She has received numerous awards and fellowships. Knust was a Fellow at the Radcliffe Institute for Advanced Study. Notable recent grants include those awarded by the Franklin Humanities Institute for the Manusucript Migration Lab and two from the Boston University Humanities Project Grant.

Knust has recently acted as the president of the New England and Eastern Canada Region of the Society of Biblical Literature, and is a member of the Studiorum Novi Testamenti Societas.

She has published multiple monographs, a number of papers, and frequently gives talks at invited lectures, conference presentations, for popular media, and workshops.

Knust and Michael W. Holmes were the New Testament general editors of New Revised Standard Version Updated Edition (NRSVue), a major revision of the New Revised Standard Version (NRSV). The NRSVue project was announced in 2017, and the NRSVue was published in 2021 (digital)/2022 (print).

== Selected publications ==
- Jennifer Wright Knust (9 November 2005). Abandoned to Lust: Sexual Slander and Ancient Christianity. Columbia University Press. ISBN 978-0-231-51004-2.
- Jennifer Wright Knust (February 7, 2012). Unprotected Texts: The Bible's Surprising Contradictions About Sex and Desire. HarborOne. ISBN 978-0061725395.
- Jennifer Knust, book review of Jennifer Glancy's Slavery in Early Christianity and J. Albert Hill's Slaves in the New Testament, Journal of Religion, 2009, pages 406–409.
- Knust, Jennifer; Wasserman, Tommy (2019). To Cast the First Stone: The Transmission of a Gospel Story. Princeton University Press. ISBN 9780691203126.
