= Urubah and Religion =

1962 book by Isma'il Raji al-Faruqi

On Arabism: 'Urubah and Religion
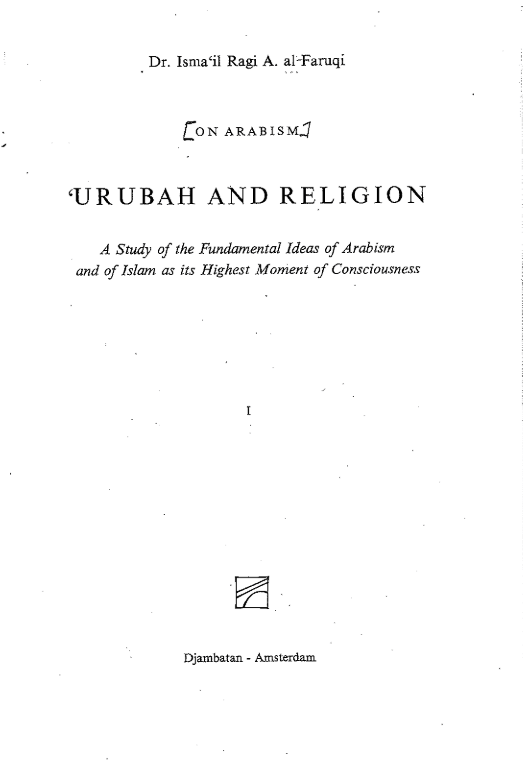
- Title page of the 1962 edition
- Author: Ismail al-Faruqi
- Language: English
- Series: On Arabism (Volume I, never completed)
- Subject: Arabism, Islamic studies, Arabs, Islam, Religion
- Published: 1962
- Publisher: Djambatan
- Publication place: Netherlands
- Media type: Print
- Pages: 287
- OCLC: 705956171
- LC Class: DS63.6 .F3
- Followed by: Christian Ethics (1967)

'Urubah and Religion: A Study of the Fundamental Ideas of Arabism and of Islam as Its Highest Moment of Consciousness (1962) is a scholarly work by Isma'il Raji al-Faruqi, published by Djambatan N.V. The book explores the concept of Arabism ('urubah), examining its historical, ethical, and spiritual dimensions, and its relationship with Islam. Al-Faruqi describes Arabism as central to Islamic history, culture, and faith, characterizing it as "the spirit which animates the stream and gives the momentum" to Islamic values.

The book was intended to be the first volume in the "On Arabism" series, which was to explore themes of art, society, and human existence concerning Arabism. However, these subsequent volumes were not completed as al-Faruqi eventually focused on broader Islamic thought and moved away from the specific framework of Arabism.

== Overview ==
'Urubah and Religion aims to present the values of Arabism and its significance for Arabs and the broader world. The book differentiates Arabism from Western nationalism, presenting it as an inclusive and universal concept based on shared ethical values. Al-Faruqi examines the historical roots of Arabism, its ethical and spiritual significance, and its relationship with Judaism, Christianity, and Islam.

== Background ==
Isma'il al-Faruqi was a scholar in Islamic studies, known for his contributions to the understanding of Islamic philosophy, theology, and history. 'Urubah and Religion reflects his interest in the cultural and ethical dimensions of Arab identity. The book was published with support from McGill University's Institute of Islamic Studies, where al-Faruqi received a fellowship to complete the manuscript.

== Contents ==
The book distinguishes Arabism from Western nationalism, emphasizing its inclusive and universal nature. Al-Faruqi presents Arabism as a historical force influencing Arab history, language, and culture, and portrays it as a divine mission. He argues that Arabism predates Islam and has played a crucial role in shaping the Arab world's development.

In his analysis, al-Faruqi explores Hebrew separatism and its historical roots, contrasting it with the universalistic faith of early Judaism. He discusses the struggle between Hebrew separatism and the universalistic tendencies of Judaism. Christianity is interpreted as a response to Hebrew separatism, with Jesus' teachings seen as an affirmation of ethical values and universal brotherhood. Al-Faruqi examines the significance of Jesus' mission in the context of Arab consciousness.

The book also addresses different nationalist positions regarding Islam and 'Urubah, categorizing them into descriptive, normative, and factitive schools. Al-Faruqi explores critiques of Islamism from nationalist perspectives, emphasizing the sufficiency of the Qur'an for ethical and spiritual guidance and advocating for a systematic approach to Islamic ethics. He discusses the prerequisites for discovering and realizing values within the Qur'anic context.

In the concluding synthesis, al-Faruqi integrates Arabism and Islam, discussing their interrelation and the role of non-Arabic speaking Muslims and Christian Arabs. 'Urubah is presented as a worldview that affirms life and values through a universalistic ethical framework.

== Themes ==
Al-Faruqi's early intellectual focus was on 'urubah (Arabism). He argued that 'urubah was the core identity and set of values uniting all Muslims into a single community of believers (ummah). Al-Faruqi believed that Arabic, as the language of the Qur'an, was essential for fully understanding the Islamic conception of the world. He posited that 'urubah was inseparable from Muslim identity, embracing both linguistic and religious dimensions. His concept of Arabism emphasized that Islam and monotheism were gifts of Arab consciousness to humanity, opposing modern race-based nationalism. He also emphasized that the revival of Islamic civilization necessitated the re-establishment of the Arabic language and culture, viewing this revival as essential to the cultural and religious unity of Muslims.

Al-Faruqi argued, "Arabism is the central reality of Islamic history, faith, and culture. It is 'as old as the Arab stream of being itself since it is the spirit which animates the stream and gives the momentum.’” This perspective positions Arabism as not merely an idea but as the foundation of Islamic values across both Muslim and non-Muslim Arabs.

As al-Faruqi’s scholarship evolved, his focus transitioned from Arabism to a broader framework of Islamic thought. While Arabism initially served as the lens through which he viewed Islamic identity, he later emphasized that Islam, rather than Arabism, should be the organizing principle for thought, society, and culture. His earlier intention to complete additional volumes in the "On Arabism" series was abandoned as he increasingly directed his efforts toward the broader concept of Islamization, seeing it as more comprehensive and universal.

Al-Faruqi’s early work on Arabism stressed that Arabic, as the language of the Qur'an, was crucial for understanding the Islamic worldview. 'Urubah was viewed as inseparable from Muslim identity, and the revival of Islamic civilization required re-establishing the Arabic language and culture. Al-Faruqi opposed modern race-based nationalism and maintained that Islam and monotheism were gifts of Arab consciousness to humanity.

== Publication ==
'Urubah and Religion was published by Djambatan N.V. in 1962. Although intended to be the first in a series exploring various aspects of 'Urubah, subsequent volumes were not written as al-Faruqi shifted his focus towards broader Islamic thought. However, themes related to Arabism's impact on art, society, and human experience were assimilated into his later works, albeit implicitly.
