= Jennifer Glancy =

Jennifer A. Glancy
- Title: Distinguished Teaching Professor in the Humanities

Academic background
- Education: Swarthmore College, Columbia University
- Thesis: Satan in the Synoptic Gospels (PhD) (1990)

Academic work
- Discipline: Biblical studies
- Sub-discipline: New Testament, Early Christianity
- Institutions: Le Moyne College
- Main interests: Christian anthropology, women’s history, slavery
- Notable works: Slavery in Early Christianity

Jennifer A. Glancy is a scholar of the New Testament and early Christianity, and The Rev. Kevin G. O’Connell, S.J., Distinguished Teaching Professor in the Humanities at Le Moyne College in Syracuse, NY. Her expertise lies in the cultural history of early Christianity, with a special emphasis on corporeality and Christian anthropology, women's history in antiquity, gender studies, and comparative studies of slavery. Her book Slavery in Early Christianity (2002) was chosen as a History Book Club selection.

== Career ==
Glancy completed in 1982 a BA Honors degree in Philosophy and English Literature at Swarthmore College. For her doctoral studies, she moved on to Columbia University where she in obtained an MA degree in 1986 and a PhD in Religion in 1990. Since 1990, she has served a professor at Le Moyne College. During a period of leave from 2008 to 2010, Glancy served as the George and Sallie Cutchin Camp Professor of Bible at the University of Richmond, Virginia.

At Le Moyne College she has been honored as both Teacher of the Year and Scholar of the Year. Glancy is also the recipient of a 2017 Summer Stipend from the National Endowment for the Humanities for current research, “The Ancient Christian Understanding of Slavery and Contemporary Discourse on the Meaning of Being Human.”

=== Slavery in early Christianity ===
Much of Glancy's career has revolved around slavery as conceived in the biblical texts as well as in early Christian history, with a focus on the sexual exploitation that slaves were subject and vulnerable to and the use of their bodies in antiquity. Her most prominent work on this subject is her book Slavery in Early Christianity (Oxford 2002). Jennifer Knust has described her work as "challenging". J. Albert Harill has entered into debate with Glancy regarding the interpretation of slavery as described in parables in the Gospels, where Harrill has argued that the parables have no meaning outside of their literary framework and need to be interpreted solely in a literary framework, whereas Glancy seeks to demonstrate that one needs to move past their literary framework and examine their real-life implications and suggestions of the role that enslavement plays in the parables. Larry Hurtado has criticized and argued that Glancy's interpretation of slaves and slavery in the letters of Paul are "interpretive violence".

== Works ==
=== Thesis ===
- Glancy, Jennifer A. (1990). Satan in the Synoptic Gospels (Ph.D.). New York, NY: Columbia University, Graduate School of Arts and Sciences. OCLC 29281548.

=== Books ===
- ——— (2002). Slavery in Early Christianity. Oxford & New York: Oxford University Press. ISBN 9780195136098. OCLC 47297590.
- ——— (2010). Jesus in Cultural Complexity. Biblical interpretation. Vol. 18. Leiden: Brill. OCLC 713960779.
- ——— (2010). Corporal Knowledge: Early Christian Bodies. New York: Oxford University Press. ISBN 9780195328158. OCLC 335662331.
- ——— (2011). Slavery as Moral Problem: In the Early Church and Today. Facets Series. Minneapolis, MS: Fortress Press. ISBN 9780800696702. OCLC 646121919.

=== Journal articles ===
- ——— (1993). "The Accused: Susanna and her readers". Journal for the Study of the Old Testament. 58: 103–116.
- ——— (1994). "Unveiling Masculinity: the construction of gender in Mark 6:17-29". Biblical Interpretation. 2 (1): 34–50. doi:10.1163/156851594X00033.
- ——— (1996). "The Mistress-Slave Dialectic: Paradoxes of Slavery in Three Lxx Narratives". Journal for the Study of the Old Testament: 71–87.
- ——— (Fall 1998). "Obstacles to Slaves Participation in the Corinthian Church". Journal of Biblical Literature. 117 (2): 481–501. doi:10.2307/3266444. JSTOR 3266444.
- ——— (Spring 2000). "Slaves and slavery in the Matthean parables". Journal of Biblical Literature. 119 (1): 67–90. doi:10.2307/3267969. JSTOR 3267969.
- ——— (Spring 2004). "Boasting of beatings (2 Corinthians 11:23-25)". Journal of Biblical Literature. 123 (1): 99–135. doi:10.2307/3268552. JSTOR 3268552.
- ——— (2005). "Torture: Flesh, Truth, and the Fourth Gospel". Biblical Interpretation. 13 (2): 107–136. doi:10.1163/1568515053683095.
- ——— (2010). "Jesus, the Syrophoenician Woman, and Other First Century Bodies". Biblical Interpretation. 18 (4–5): 342–363. doi:10.1163/156851510X517582.
- ——— (Fall 2011). "How Typical a Roman Prostitute Is Revelation's "Great Whore"?". Journal of Biblical Literature. 130 (3): 551–569. doi:10.2307/41304219. JSTOR 41304219. S2CID 161630685.
- ——— (2012). "Slavery in Acts of Thomas". Journal of Early Christian History. 2 (2): 3–21. doi:10.1080/2222582X.2012.11877262. S2CID 172026617.
- ——— (Spring 2015). "The Sexual Use of Slaves: A Response to Kyle Harper on Jewish and Christian Porneia". Journal of Biblical Literature. 134 (1): 215–229. doi:10.15699/jbl.1341.2015.2838.
