= Peccatism =

Christian concept of universal human sinfulness

Peccatism is the belief that human beings are inherently sinful and need divine redemption, a conviction closely tied to the Christian doctrine of original sin. It is an analytical term from comparative theology; it is not used within Christianity as a self-description.

The Christian doctrine of original sin holds that humanity inherited a fallen nature from the first humans, Adam and Eve, and that redemption comes through the death and resurrection of Jesus Christ. The term peccatism has been used to set this teaching against the views of human nature found in Islam and Judaism.

== Etymology ==
The word "peccatism" comes from the Latin peccatum, meaning "sin". The root "pecc-" appears in other English words, among them "peccant", for something sinful or morally wrong, and "impeccable", for something without fault. The suffix "-ism" denotes a doctrine or belief system. In this sense the word was coined in 1967 by the Muslim philosopher Isma'il Raji al-Faruqi, who joined the suffix to the Latin root to name the belief in the inherent sinfulness of human beings and paired it with a companion coinage, saviourism.

== The Christian doctrine of sin ==
In Christian theology sin is the central problem facing humanity. It covers acts, thoughts, and intentions that fall outside moral and divine standards, and the tradition gives it many names, among them iniquity, corruption, rebellion, and evil.

One definition treats sin as any attitude or act by which a person rebels against the love commandment of Jesus, or fails to answer it. On the same account, sin is self-love and self-centeredness, and a person counts as a sinner before God only with enough maturity, knowledge, and freedom to make moral choices.

Christian writing names many forms of sin. Transgression is the breaking of a rule or law. Witchcraft, the practice of magic, counts as sin, as does abomination, the doing of detestable acts. Wickedness shows itself in evil conduct, unrighteousness in unfair or unjust dealing, and immorality in unethical behavior. Sin also takes in omission, the failure to do what is right; the entertaining of impure thoughts; and unbelief, the absence of faith in God.

=== Original sin ===
The doctrine of original sin holds that humanity inherited a fallen nature from the first humans, Adam and Eve. Augustine of Hippo was the first writer to use the Latin phrase peccatum originale, in his polemics against the Pelagians, although the underlying idea had been worked out earlier by Irenaeus of Lyons during the 2nd-century dispute with Gnosticism.

In the Eastern Orthodox tradition the inherited condition is usually called ancestral sin: the East assigns personal guilt to Adam and Eve alone and treats mortality, rather than inherited guilt, as what passes to their descendants.

=== Historical development ===
Sin has been a core theme in Christianity from its earliest period, though Christian writers have not agreed on how far it reaches into human nature.

==== Apostolic Fathers and the early church ====
The earliest Christian writers, the Apostolic Fathers, did not treat sin as an inherent or overwhelming feature of human nature. For them sin came through personal choice, and reason and moral effort had a real part in salvation. Justin Martyr and the Greek Fathers held that human beings keep the freedom to do good after the fall, a position later set against the idea of total depravity. John E. Toews argues that the doctrine of inherited sin, as it came to be taught in the West, has thin support in the Genesis text and little presence in the Apostolic Fathers.

==== Augustine and the Pelagian controversy ====
In the early 5th century the British monk Pelagius taught that human beings can take the first step toward salvation by their own effort, without a prior gift of grace. Augustine opposed him, holding that sin had so weakened the will that no one could turn to God without grace. Augustine read original sin as a nature inherited by every human through the fall of Adam and Eve in the Garden of Eden. His position carried into both Roman Catholic and Protestant theology and shaped Western Christianity for centuries.

==== Conciliar definitions ====
The Council of Carthage of 418 set the Augustinian view against Pelagius. Its canons affirmed that Adam's sin brought death to his descendants and that infants are baptized for the remission of an inherited fault. More than eleven centuries later the Council of Trent, at its fifth session on 17 June 1546, issued a decree on original sin with five canons. The decree condemned the Pelagian denial of inherited sin and also rejected the Protestant teaching that baptism does not remove it.

==== The Reformation ====
During the 16th-century Reformation, Martin Luther and John Calvin pressed the doctrine of original sin further. In On the Bondage of the Will (1525) Luther argued, against Erasmus, that the unredeemed will can choose only sin. Calvin's doctrine of total depravity holds that sin reaches through the whole of human nature and that people cannot reach righteousness on their own. The Synod of Dort (1618–1619) restated this teaching in the canons later summarized by the acronym TULIP, though scholars caution that the acronym distorts both the canons and Calvin's own thought.

==== Gnostic interpretations ====
Gnosticism held a position of its own. On the Gnostic account the material world is the work of a lesser and malevolent creator, the demiurge, and salvation comes through gnosis, saving knowledge, rather than through moral conduct or atonement. Elaine Pagels notes that several Gnostic texts present Christ as a revealer of hidden knowledge rather than as a redeemer from sin.

=== Redemption and atonement ===
Christian teaching holds that God requires sinless perfection, a life kept wholly free of sin; a blood sacrifice offered in atonement; and faith, trust in God's plan for salvation. These point to the weight Christianity places on the sacrificial death and resurrection of Jesus Christ for the forgiveness of sins.

In Christianity the cross is the central symbol. It stands for Jesus's death as a substitutionary atonement for the sins of humanity. Christians hold that Jesus, himself sinless, took the punishment for human sin and so opened redemption and the promise of eternal life to those who have faith in him. Christian writers have explained the atonement in more than one way. Anselm of Canterbury, in Cur Deus Homo (c. 1098), framed it as satisfaction owed to God's honor. Gustaf Aulén later distinguished this satisfaction model, the penal substitution model, and an older "Christus Victor" model in which the death of Christ defeats the powers of sin and death.

== Al-Faruqi's concept of peccatism ==
In Christian Ethics: A Historical and Systematic Analysis of Its Dominant Ideas (1967), completed at McGill University, al-Faruqi used peccatism for the conviction that sin is a standing condition of human nature, and saviourism for the matching conviction that humanity therefore needs a divine savior. On his reading the two ideas entered Christian teaching after the time of Jesus and turned an original ethical message into what he called Christianism.

According to David Marshall, al-Faruqi treated belief in original sin as the heart of what he meant by peccatism, and held that it cut against human moral autonomy. Al-Faruqi judged that making sin a precondition of God's dealings with humanity verged on blasphemy, and he called on Christians to undertake a "Second Reformation" that would recover the teaching of Jesus.

=== Reception ===
Al-Faruqi's analysis has been examined and contested. F. Peter Ford reads it as a Christian-facing argument that Islam preserves a message Christianity lost. Ng Kam Weng questions whether the account represents Christian doctrine fairly. Christian theologians have defended the doctrine of original sin as a realistic account of universal moral failure and as the presupposition of grace, and they distinguish the inherited condition from personal guilt, a distinction the Eastern churches draw sharply.

== Comparative context ==
Al-Faruqi developed the idea of peccatism as a contrast with the Islamic view of human nature, and later writers have drawn similar comparisons with Judaism.

=== Islam ===
Islam has no doctrine of inherited sin. According to Yasien Mohamed, it teaches that every person is born in a state of natural purity, the fitra, and sins only by later choice. The Qur'an calls the believer to the fitra of God upon which humanity was created. A widely transmitted hadith holds that every child is born upon the fitra and is then shaped by its upbringing. In Islamic teaching Adam's lapse in the garden is treated as a personal error, forgiven after repentance, with no guilt passed to his descendants.

=== Judaism ===
Rabbinic Judaism explains the human capacity for wrongdoing through the yetzer hara, the evil inclination, set against the yetzer hatov, the good inclination, rather than through inherited guilt. The tradition stresses free will and personal responsibility, holding that a person may master the inclination toward sin.

== See also ==
- Original sin
- Ancestral sin
- Christian views on sin
- Total depravity
- Fall of man
- Hamartiology
- Fitra
- Christian anthropology
