= Christian Ethics (book) =

1967 book by Isma'il Raji al-Faruqi

Christian Ethics: A Historical and Systematic Analysis of Its Dominant Ideas
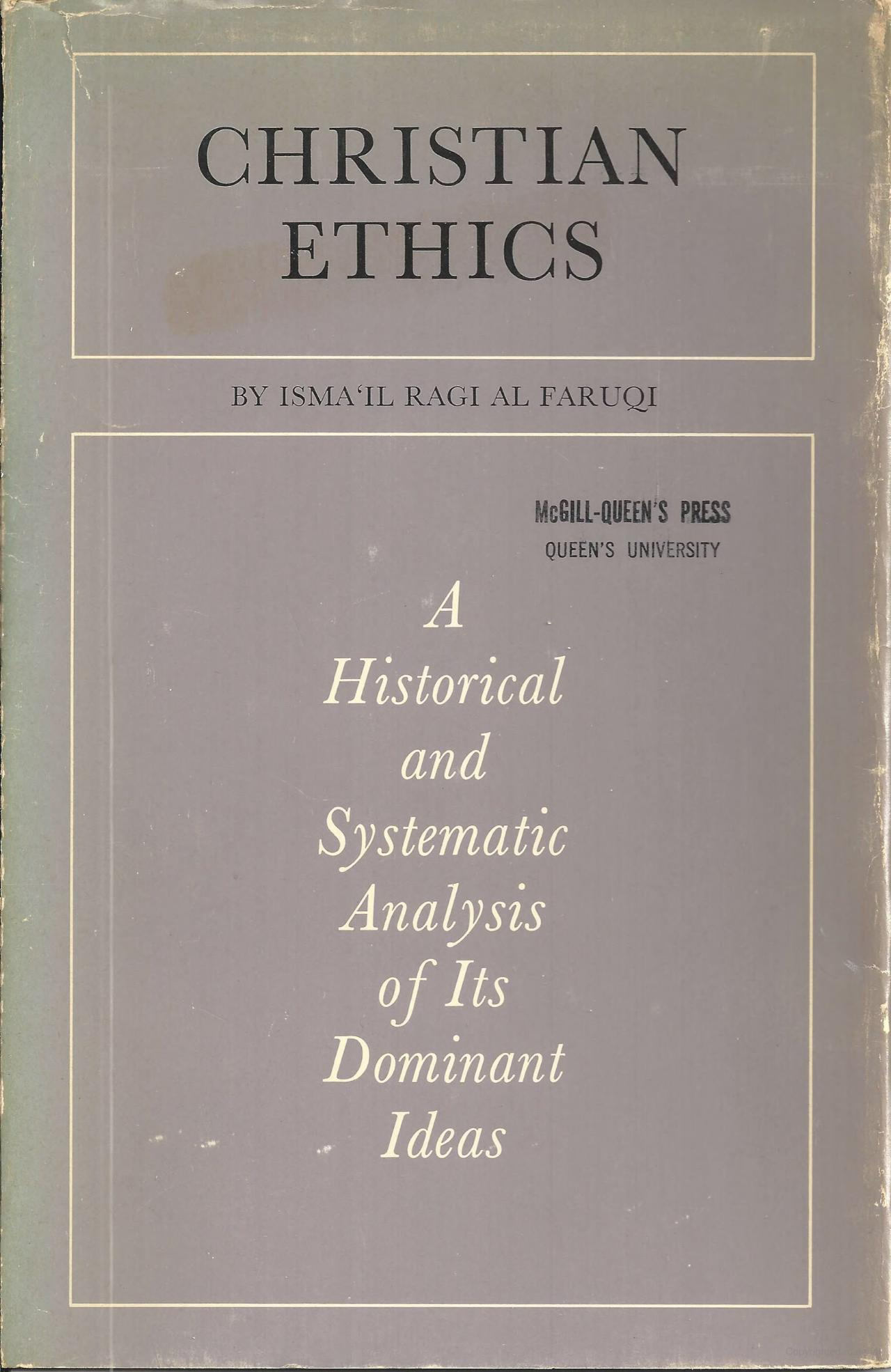
- Cover of the 1967 edition
- Author: Ismail al-Faruqi
- Language: English
- Subject: Christian ethics, Comparative religion, Christianity
- Published: 1967
- Publisher: McGill University Press
- Publication place: Canada
- Media type: Print
- Pages: 333
- ISBN: 9780773592711
- OCLC: 450143
- Preceded by: On Arabism: 'Urubah and Religion (1962)
- Followed by: Islam and the Problem of Israel (1980)

Christian Ethics: A Historical and Systematic Analysis of Its Dominant Ideas (1967) is a book by Ismail al-Faruqi that examines Christian ethical thought in historical and systematic terms. Al-Faruqi writes from a Muslim standpoint and traces the development of the main Christian moral doctrines, arguing that several of them depart from the teachings of Jesus through what he identifies as theological inconsistency and the absorption of non-Semitic ideas.

The book argues for an ethical framework grounded in reason. It was among the earliest sustained Muslim critiques of Christian dogma and ethics in the modern era, and it drew responses from both Muslim and Christian scholars working in comparative religion and interfaith dialogue.

== Background ==
Al-Faruqi wrote Christian Ethics as part of his wider project of examining other religious traditions through reason and systematic analysis. He worked on the book during his time at McGill University, where Wilfred Cantwell Smith and Stanley Brice Frost shaped his thinking. He treated reason as the basis for academic dialogue and held that ethical inquiry offered neutral ground for evaluating religious doctrine. His aim was a full critique of Christian ethics set within the broader study of religious and moral philosophy.

Scholars describe the work as one of the first modern Muslim critiques of Christian theological and ethical development. Al-Faruqi's central claim is that Christianity moved away from the original teachings of Jesus by taking in Hellenistic and other non-Semitic influences, which he treated as distortions.

== Contents ==
The book runs across several chapters, each treating a different aspect of Christian ethics and its historical development.

=== The Jewish Background ===
This chapter examines the Jewish context in which the teachings of Jesus emerged. Al-Faruqi discusses Hebrew racialism, the political and social conditions of the period, and the ethical norms current among the Jewish people. He argues that the Jewish view of human sinfulness fed into Christian thought, in particular the doctrine of original sin, which he dates to the exilic and post-exilic periods. He reads these developments as early forms of what he later calls "peccatism" and "saviourism".

=== The Ethical Teachings of Jesus ===
Al-Faruqi examines the ethical teachings of Jesus and how they broke from Jewish norms. The chapter covers the approach of Jesus to politics, social questions, family, personal conduct, and cosmic concerns. Al-Faruqi reads Jesus as placing the intention behind an act above mere observance of the law.

=== Christian Legalism and Ethical Breakthrough ===
This section sets the teachings of Jesus against later Christian legalism. Al-Faruqi criticises a development in Christian doctrine that, in his account, drifted far from the original message of Jesus. He draws a parallel between the ethics of Jesus and Sufi traditions.

=== The Christianist Transvaluation ===
Al-Faruqi traces how Christian ethics changed over time, above all during the Reformation and in modern Christianity. He discusses shifts in the understanding of sin, salvation, and the imago Dei (image of God), and criticises their effect on Christian thought. He holds that the doctrine of original sin runs directly against the teachings of Jesus, which in his reading make ethical worth a matter of the conscious self's will alone.

=== Sin and Salvation ===
This chapter treats peccatism (the idea of inherent human sinfulness) and saviourism (the belief in Jesus as redeemer). Al-Faruqi sets these against Islamic views and argues for what he sees as a more rational account of sin and salvation. He criticises the Christian treatment of sin as a universal and necessary condition, holding that it was a later development absent from the teaching of Jesus. He called for a new Reformation to recover the original faith of Jesus and suggested that Islam could be an ally in that effort.

=== Meta-Religion and Logical Consistency ===
Al-Faruqi introduces the concept of meta-religion, a set of principles for judging religious systems. He treats logical consistency as a test for religious thought, criticises Christian theological paradox, and argues for a rational reading of doctrine. The method calls for setting aside one's own beliefs in order to understand the religion under study on its own terms.

=== The Role of Epochè ===
Al-Faruqi uses the method of epochè, or religio-cultural disengagement, which studies religious phenomena without prior assumptions. He examines the Jewish background of the teachings of Jesus, sets them against Jewish law, and compares Sufi and Christian ethics. He treats epochè as a useful phenomenological tool for reaching impartiality, though only as a first step. In his view the scholar must in the end pass judgment on religious traditions instead of resting in neutrality, and he draws here on an approach close to that of Ibn Hazm.

=== Table of Contents ===
Christian Ethics: A Historical and Systematic Analysis of Its Dominant Ideas
Main Sections and Subsections
Part One: What is the Ethic of Jesus?
I The Jewish Background: Jewish Ethic	Hebrew Racialism
I The Jewish Background: Jewish Ethic	Hebrew Scripture as a Record of Hebrew Racialism
I The Jewish Background: Jewish Ethic	The Ethico-Political Situation at the Time of Jesus
II The Ethical Breakthrough of Jesus	In Reaction to Jewish Ethic
II The Ethical Breakthrough of Jesus	The Ethic of Intent
II The Ethical Breakthrough of Jesus	The Final Disposition of the Law
II The Ethical Breakthrough of Jesus	The Content of Self-Transformation
III Dialectic of the New Ethic	The Old Values and the New
III Dialectic of the New Ethic	In the Realm of the Political
III Dialectic of the New Ethic	In the Realm of the Social
III Dialectic of the New Ethic	In the Realm of the Family
III Dialectic of the New Ethic	In the Realm of the Personal
III Dialectic of the New Ethic	In the Realm of the Cosmic
IV The Sufi Parallel	The Parallelism
IV The Sufi Parallel	Its Explanation
Part Two: The Christianist Transvaluation
V What is Man? The Imago Dei	In Hellenic Christianity
V What is Man? The Imago Dei	In Pre-Reformation Christianity
V What is Man? The Imago Dei	In the Reformation
V What is Man? The Imago Dei	In the Christianity of Modern Times
VI What Ought Man to Be? Sin and Salvation	Man is a Fallen Creature: Peccatism
VI What Ought Man to Be? Sin and Salvation	The Jewish Background
VI What Ought Man to Be? Sin and Salvation	The Christianist Transvaluation of the Jewish Idea of the Fall
VI What Ought Man to Be? Sin and Salvation	Sin in the Gospel
VI What Ought Man to Be? Sin and Salvation	Sin in the Teaching of Paul
VI What Ought Man to Be? Sin and Salvation	Sin in the Teaching of the Apostolic Fathers
VI What Ought Man to Be? Sin and Salvation	Sin before Augustine
VI What Ought Man to Be? Sin and Salvation	Augustine: The Exemplar of Peccatism
VI What Ought Man to Be? Sin and Salvation	Sin in the Reformation
VI What Ought Man to Be? Sin and Salvation	Peccatism and Contemporary Christian Thought
VI What Ought Man to Be? Sin and Salvation	Man is Reconciled: Saviourism
VI What Ought Man to Be? Sin and Salvation	Christianity is the Religion of Redemption
VI What Ought Man to Be? Sin and Salvation	The Nature of Saviourist Salvation
VII What Ought Man to Be? Church and Society	Christianism and Society
VII What Ought Man to Be? Church and Society	In Traditional Theology
VII What Ought Man to Be? Church and Society	In Modern Theology
VII What Ought Man to Be? Church and Society	The Case of William Temple
VII What Ought Man to Be? Church and Society	The Case of Karl Barth
VII What Ought Man to Be? Church and Society	In the Theology of the Future
VII What Ought Man to Be? Church and Society	The Lack of Societist Foundations and the Split Consciousness of Western Man
VII What Ought Man to Be? Church and Society	The Societist Transvaluation
VII What Ought Man to Be? Church and Society	The A-Societism of Reinhold Niebuhr
VII What Ought Man to Be? Church and Society	Conclusion
Epilogue
Index of Subjects
Index of Biblical Quotations
Index of Authors and Book Titles

== Themes ==
The book takes part in interfaith dialogue by reading Christianity critically from a Muslim standpoint. Its recurring themes include the inward turn of ethics, self-transformation, and the rational testing of religious doctrine. Al-Faruqi criticises "peccatism", the belief in inherent human sinfulness, and "saviourism", the doctrine of Jesus as redeemer, and sets both against Islamic ideas of human nature and accountability.

Much of his critique falls on the place of paradox in Christian theology, which he argues weakens its logical and ethical coherence. He calls for a rational basis for religious thought and for doctrine that holds together under reason. He also reads the treatment of Jewish law by Jesus as a working "code of utility" rather than a full ethical system.

Hellenistic and other non-Semitic influences, in his account, shaped Christian theology and distorted the original teachings of Jesus. On the strength of these arguments he presents Islam as a model of rational ethical monotheism, free of the theological contradictions he finds in Christianity.

== Publication and reviews ==
McGill University Press published Christian Ethics: A Historical and Systematic Analysis of Its Dominant Ideas in 1967, with support from several academic and philanthropic bodies, among them the Rockefeller Foundation. Scholars have treated it as one of the first critiques of Christianity and Christian ethics by a modern Muslim writer. They have also read it as a contribution to comparative religion that examines points of contact and difference between Islamic and Christian moral thought.

Some Christian theologians raised reservations about his conclusions. Reviewers nonetheless credited his close engagement with both Christian and Islamic sources, and early assessments held that his method and analysis deserved serious attention in interfaith and academic discussion.
