= Christianity and Islam =

Christianity and Islam are the two largest religions in the world, with approximately 2.3 billion and 2 billion adherents, respectively. Both are Abrahamic religions and monotheistic, originating in the Middle East.

Christianity developed out of Second Temple Judaism in the 1st century CE. It is founded on the life, teachings, death, and resurrection of Jesus Christ, and those who follow it are called Christians. Islam developed in the 7th century CE. It is founded on the teachings of Muhammad, as an expression of surrendering to the will of God. Those who follow it are called Muslims (meaning "submitters to God").

Muslims view Christians to be People of the Book, but may also regard them as committing shirk (idolatry) because of the doctrines of the Trinity and the Incarnation. Christians are traditionally classified as dhimmis (non-muslims) paying jizya (tax on non-muslims) under Sharia law. Christians similarly possess a wide range of views about Islam. Many Christians view Islam as a false religion because its adherents reject the Trinity, the divinity of Christ, the Crucifixion and Resurrection of Christ.

Like Christianity, Islam considers Jesus to be al-Masih (Arabic for the Messiah) who was sent to guide the Banī Isrā'īl (Arabic for Children of Israel) with a new revelation: al-Injīl (Arabic for "the Gospel"). But while belief in Jesus is a fundamental tenet of both, a critical distinction far more central to most Christian faiths is that Jesus is the incarnated God, specifically, one of the hypostases of the Triune God, God the Son.

While Christianity and Islam hold their recollections of Jesus's teachings as gospel and share narratives from the first five books of the Old Testament (the Hebrew Bible), the sacred text of Christianity also includes the later additions to the Bible while the primary sacred text of Islam instead is the Quran. Muslims believe that al-Injīl was distorted or altered to form the Christian New Testament. Christians, on the contrary, do not have a univocal understanding of the Quran, though many believe that it to be a fabricated or apocryphal work. There are similarities in both texts, such as accounts of the life and works of Jesus and the virgin birth of Jesus through Mary; yet still, some Biblical and Quranic accounts of these events differ.

== Similarities and differences ==
In the Islamic tradition, Christians and Jews are believed to worship the same God that Muslims worship. However there are many different opinions in the discussion of whether Muslims and Christians worship the same God.

=== Scriptures ===
The Christian Bible is made up of the Old Testament and the New Testament. The Old Testament was written over a period of two millennia prior to the birth of Christ. The New Testament was written in the decades following the death of Christ. Historically, Christians universally believed that the entire Bible was the divinely inspired Word of God. However, the rise of harsher criticism during the Enlightenment has led to a diversity of views concerning the authority and inerrancy of the Bible in different denominations. Christians consider the Quran to be a non-divine set of texts.

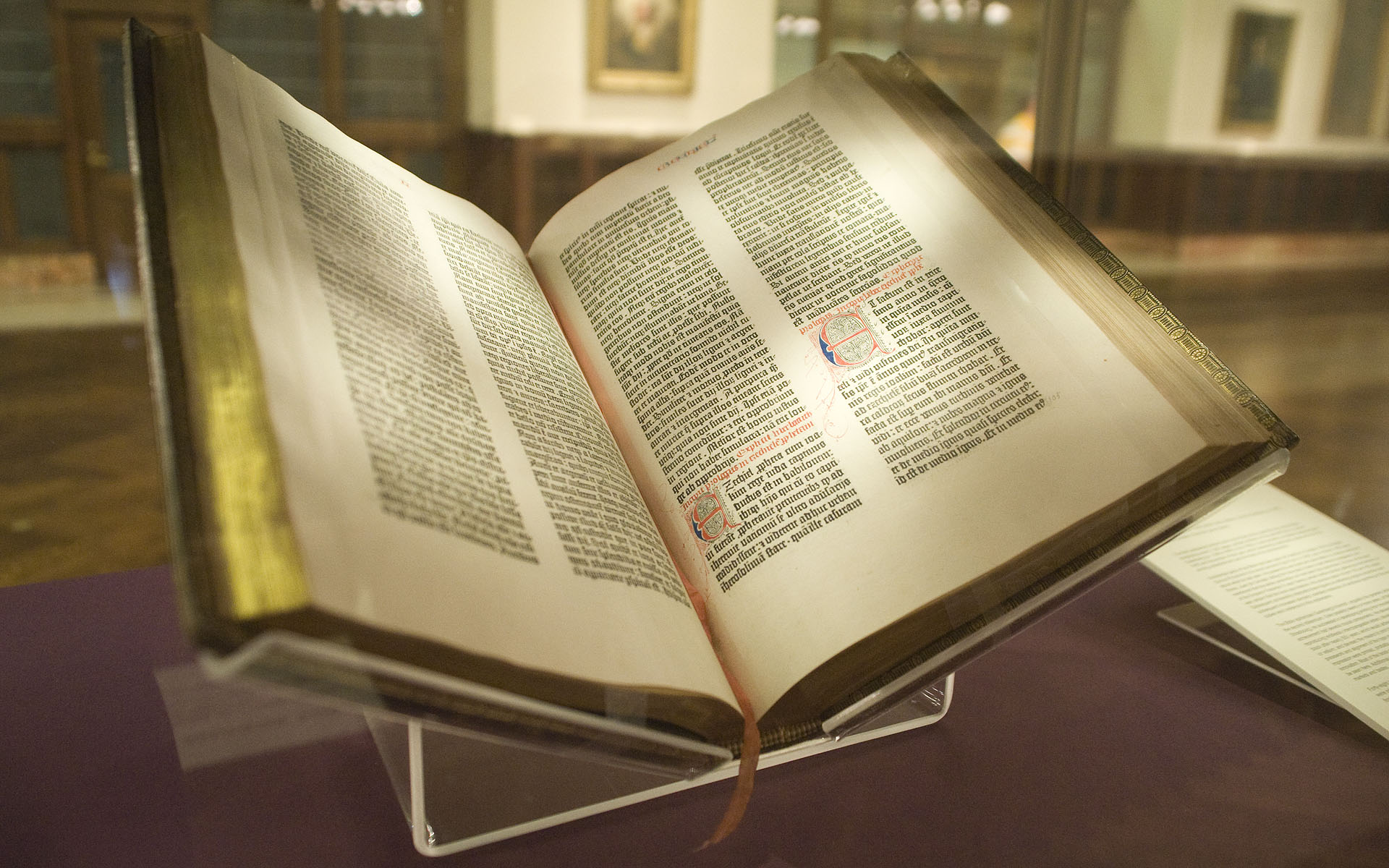
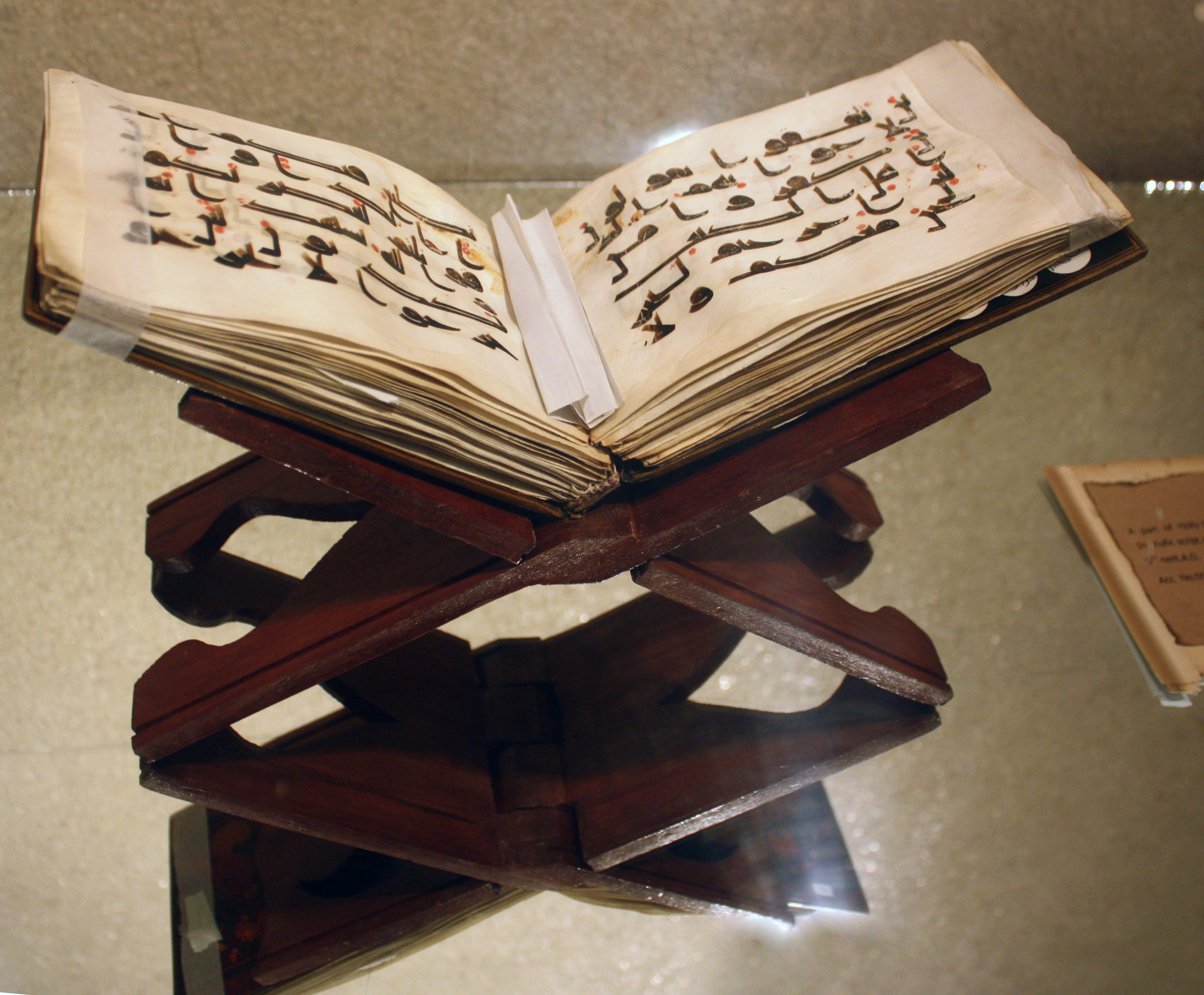
The Bible (left) and the Quran (right)

The Quran dates from the early 7th century or decades thereafter. Muslims believe it was revealed to Muhammad, gradually over a period of approximately 23 years, beginning on 22 December 609, when Muhammad was 40, and concluding in 632, the year of his death. The Quran is written mostly in parable and not in form of a linear process of history. However, the stories often involve Biblical figures. By that, the Quran assumes that the audience is familiar with their associated narratives. Sometimes, stories featuring in the Bible are summarized, dwelled at length, and sometimes entirely different. Another difference in style is that the Bible offers a linear set of time, from the beginning of the narrative to its end, while the Quran implies a cyclical pattern, in which the main narrative of the Quran unfolds repeatedly at the time of each prophet.

Muslims believe that Jesus was given the Injil (Greek evangel, or Gospel) by God, however that parts or the entirety of these teachings were lost or distorted (tahrif) to produce the Hebrew Bible and the Christian New Testament. The majority of Muslims consider the Quran to be the only revealed book that has been protected by God from distortion or corruption.

=== Jesus ===
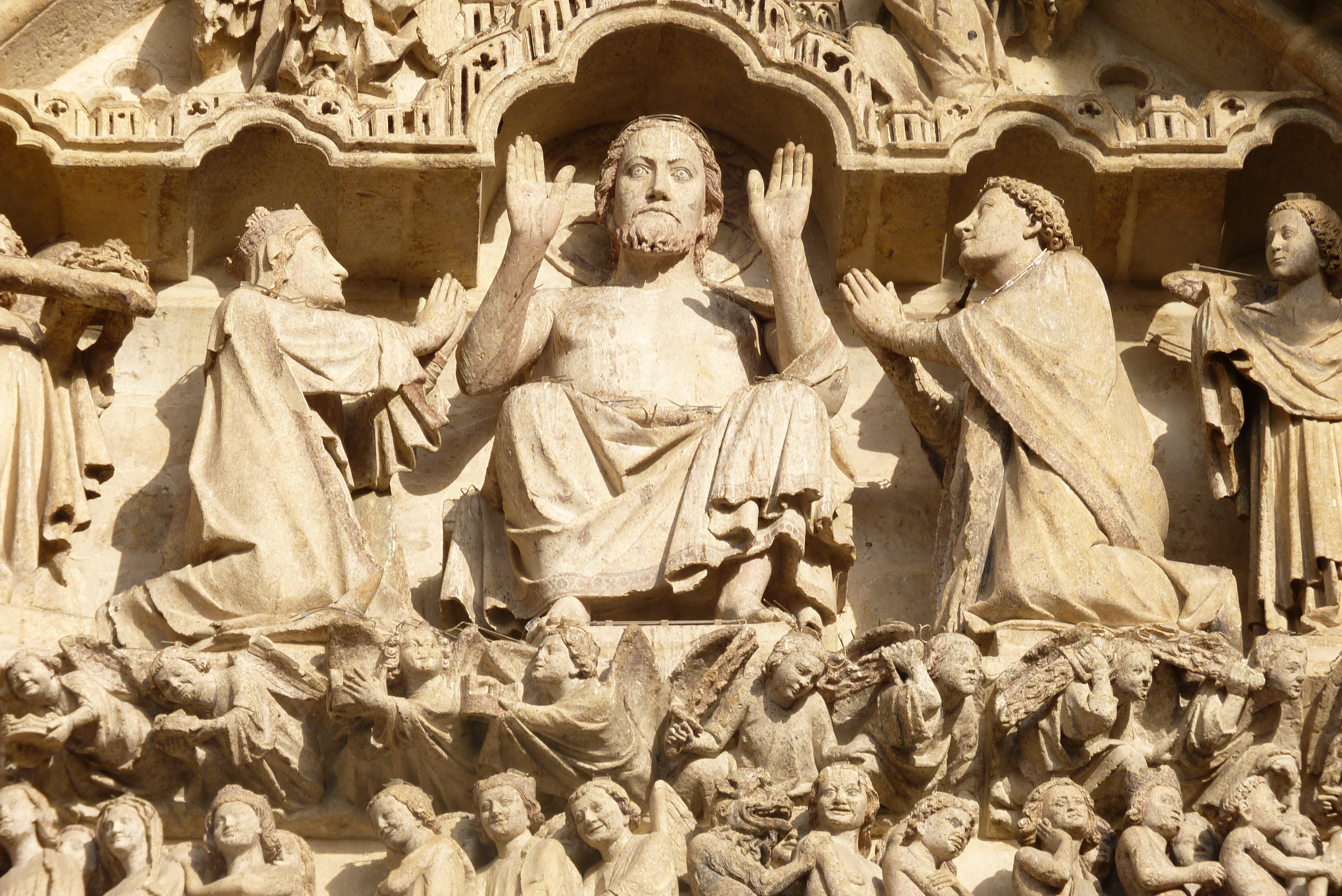
A relief depicting the final judgement of sinners by Jesus at Amiens Cathedral, France. The divinity of Jesus is an important aspect differentiating the two faiths.

Muslims and Christians both believe that Jesus was born to Mary, a virgin. They both also believe that Jesus is the Messiah and the second coming. However, they differ on other key issues regarding Jesus. Almost all Christians believe that Jesus was the incarnated Son of God, divine, and sinless. Islam teaches that Jesus was the penultimate and one of the most important prophets of God, but not the Son of God, not divine, and not part of the Trinity. Rather, Muslims believe the creation of Jesus was similar to the creation of Adam.

Christianity and Islam also differ in their fundamental views related to the crucifixion and resurrection of Jesus. Christianity teaches that Jesus was condemned to death by the Sanhedrin and the Roman prefect Pontius Pilate, crucified, and after three days, resurrected. Islam teaches that Jesus was a human prophet who, like the other prophets, tried to bring his people to worship the one true God, termed Tawhid. Muslims also believe that Jesus was condemned to crucifixion and then miraculously saved from execution, and was raised to the heavens. In Islam, instead of Jesus being crucified, his lookalike was crucified.

Both Christians and Muslims believe in the Second Coming of Jesus. Christianity does not state where will Jesus return, while the Hadith in Islam states that Jesus will return at a white minaret at the east of Damascus (believed to be the Minaret of Isa in the Umayyad Mosque), and will pray behind Mahdi. Christians believe that Jesus will return to kill the Antichrist and similarly Muslims believe that Jesus will return to kill Dajjal. Many Christians believe that Jesus would then rule for 1,000 years, while Muslims believe Jesus will rule for forty years, marry, have children and will be buried at the Green Dome.

=== Muhammad ===
Muslims believe that Muhammad was a prophet who received revelations (Quran) by God through the angel Gabriel (Jibril), gradually over a period of approximately 23 years, beginning on 22 December 609, when Muhammad was 40, and concluding in 632, the year of his death. Muslims regard the Quran as the most important miracle of Muhammad, a proof of his prophethood.

Muslims revere Muhammad as the embodiment of the perfect believer and take his actions and sayings as a model of ideal conduct. Unlike Jesus, who Christians believe was God's son, Muhammad was a mortal, albeit with extraordinary qualities. Today many Muslims believe that it is wrong to represent Muhammad, but this was not always the case. At various times and places pious Muslims represented Muhammad although they never worshiped these images.

During the lifetime of Muhammad, he had some interactions with Christians. One of the first Christians who met Muhammad was Waraqah ibn Nawfal, a Christian ascetic of ancient Arabia. He is also alternatively said to be one of the first hanifs to believe in the prophecy of Muhammad. Muhammad also met the Najrani Christians and made peace with them. One of the earliest recorded comments of a Christian reaction to Muhammad can be dated to only a few years after Muhammad's death. As stories of the Arab prophet spread to Christian Syria, an old man who was asked about the "prophet who has appeared with the Saracens" responded: "He is false, for the prophets do not come armed with a sword."

=== God ===
In Christianity, the most common name of God is Yahweh. In Islam, the most common name of God is Allah, similar to Eloah in the Old Testament. The vast majority of the world's Christians adhere to the doctrine of the Trinity, which in creedal formulations states that God is three hypostases (the Father, the Son and the Spirit) in one ousia (substance). In Islam, this concept is deemed to be a denial of monotheism, and thus a sin of shirk, which is considered to be a major (al-Kaba'ir) sin. The Quran itself refers to Trinity in Al-Ma'ida 5:73 which says "They have certainly disbelieved who say, "Allah is the third of three." And there is no god except one God. And if they do not desist from what they are saying, there will surely afflict the disbelievers among them a painful punishment." Islam has the concept of Tawhid which is the concept of a single, indivisible God, who has no partners.

=== The Holy Spirit ===
Christians and Muslims have differing views about the Holy Spirit. Most Christians believe that the Holy Spirit is God, and the third member of the Trinity. In Islam, the Holy Spirit is generally believed to be the angel Gabriel. Most Christians believe that the Paraclete referred to in the Gospel of John, who was manifested on the day of Pentecost, is the Holy Spirit. On the other hand, some Islamic scholars believe that the reference to the Paraclete is a prophecy of the coming of Muhammad.

One of the key verses concerning the Paraclete is John 16:7:

"Nevertheless I tell you the truth: It is expedient for you that I go away; for if I go not away, the Comforter[Paraclete] will not come unto you; but if I go, I will send him unto you."

=== Salvation ===
The Catechism of the Catholic Church, the official doctrine document released by the Roman Catholic Church, has this to say regarding Muslims:

The Church's relationship with the Muslims. "The plan of salvation also includes those who acknowledge the Creator, in the first place amongst whom are the Muslims; these profess to hold the faith of Abraham, and together with us they adore the one, merciful God, mankind's judge on the last day."

— Catechism of the Catholic Church

Protestant theology mostly emphasizes the necessity of faith in Jesus as a savior for salvation. Muslims may receive salvation in theologies relating to Universal reconciliation, but will not according to most Protestant theologies based on justification through faith:

"The first and chief article is this: Jesus Christ, our God and Lord, died for our sins and was raised again for our justification (Romans 3:24–25). He alone is the Lamb of God who takes away the sins of the world (John 1:29), and God has laid on Him the iniquity of us all (Isaiah 53:6). All have sinned and are justified freely, without their own works and merits, by His grace, through the redemption that is in Christ Jesus, in His blood (Romans 3:23–25). This is necessary to believe. This cannot be otherwise acquired or grasped by any work, law or merit. Therefore, it is clear and certain that this faith alone justifies us ... Nothing of this article can be yielded or surrendered, even though heaven and earth and everything else falls (Mark 13:31)."

— Martin Luther

Some modern Muslim scholars critique the doctrinal aspects of Christianity. For example, Isma'il Raji al-Faruqi, in his work Christian Ethics: A Historical and Systematic Analysis of Its Dominant Ideas, argues that Christianity has incorporated various influences that diverge from Jesus' original teachings. He emphasizes the need for what he considers a rational and coherent ethical framework, contrasting Christian concepts like peccatism (inherent human sinfulness) and saviorism (belief in Jesus as the redeemer) with Islamic views. This perspective includes a critique of Christian theological paradoxes and advocates for a rational and coherent ethical framework.

The Quran explicitly promises salvation for all those righteous Christians who were there before the arrival of Muhammad:

Indeed, the believers, Jews, Christians, and Sabians—whoever ˹truly˺ believes in Allah and the Last Day and does good will have their reward with their Lord. And there will be no fear for them, nor will they grieve.

— Surah Al-Baqara 2:62

The Quran also makes it clear that Christians will be nearest in love to those who follow the Quran and praises Christians for being humble and wise:

You will surely find the most bitter towards the believers to be the Jews and polytheists and the most gracious to be those who call themselves Christian. That is because there are priests and monks among them and because they are not arrogant. When they listen to what has been revealed to the Messenger, you see their eyes overflowing with tears for recognizing the truth. They say, “Our Lord! We believe, so count us among the witnesses. Why should we not believe in Allah and the truth that has come to us? And we long for our Lord to include us in the company of the righteous.” So Allah will reward them for what they said with Gardens under which rivers flow, to stay there forever. And that is the reward of the good-doers.

— Surah Al-Ma'idah 5:82–84

== Early and medieval Christian writers on Islam and Muhammad ==
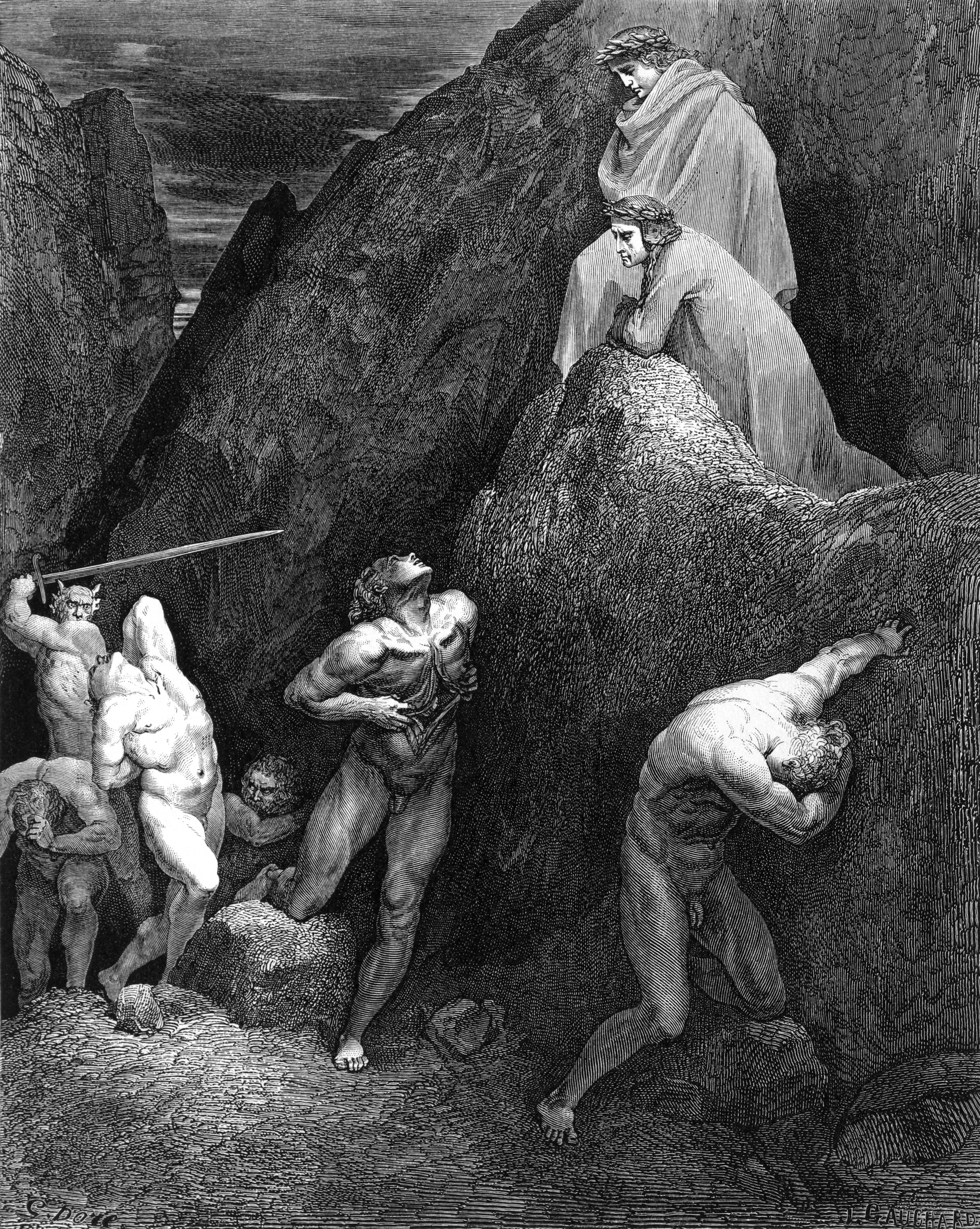
Dante and Virgil look down at Muhammad, who suffers in hell as a schismatic, in an illustration of the Divine Comedy by Gustave Doré. During the Middle Ages, Islam was often seen as a Christological heresy and Muhammad as a false prophet.

=== John of Damascus ===
In 746, John of Damascus (sometimes St. John of Damascus) wrote the Fount of Knowledge part two of which is entitled Heresies in Epitome: How They Began and Whence They Drew Their Origin. In this work, John makes extensive reference to the Quran and, in John's opinion, its failure to live up to even the most basic scrutiny. The work is not exclusively concerned with the Ismaelites (a name for the Muslims as they claimed to have descended from Ismael) but all heresy. The Fount of Knowledge references several suras directly often with apparent incredulity.

From that time to the present a false prophet named Mohammed has appeared in their midst. This man, after having chanced upon the Old and New Testaments and likewise, it seems, having conversed with an Arian monk, devised his own heresy. Then, having insinuated himself into the good graces of the people by a show of seeming piety, he gave out that a certain book had been sent down to him from heaven. He had set down some ridiculous compositions in this book of his and he gave it to them as an object of veneration. ... There are many other extraordinary and quite ridiculous things in this book which he boasts was sent down to him from God. But when we ask: 'And who is there to testify that God gave him the book? And which of the prophets foretold that such a prophet would rise up?' – they are at a loss. And we remark that Moses received the Law on Mount Sinai, with God appearing in the sight of all the people in cloud, and fire, and darkness, and storm. And we say that all the Prophets from Moses on down foretold the coming of Christ and how Christ God (and incarnate Son of God) was to come and to be crucified and die and rise again, and how He was to be the judge of the living and dead. Then, when we say: 'How is it that this prophet of yours did not come in the same way, with others bearing witness to him? And how is it that God did not in your presence present this man with the book to which you refer, even as He gave the Law to Moses, with the people looking on and the mountain smoking, so that you, too, might have certainty?' – they answer that God does as He pleases. 'This,' we say, 'We know, but we are asking how the book came down to your prophet.' Then they reply that the book came down to him while he was asleep.

=== Theophanes the Confessor ===
Theophanes the Confessor (died c. 822) wrote a series of chronicles (284 onwards and 602–813 AD) based initially on those of the better known George Syncellus. Theophanes reports about Muhammad thus:

At the beginning of his advent the misguided Jews thought he was the Messiah. ... But when they saw him eating camel meat, they realized that he was not the one they thought him to be, ... those wretched men taught him illicit things directed against us, Christians, and remained with him.

Whenever he came to Palestine he consorted with Jews and Christians and sought from them certain scriptural matters. He was also afflicted with epilepsy. When his wife became aware of this, she was greatly distressed, inasmuch as she, a noblewoman, had married a man such as he, who was not only poor, but also an epileptic. He tried deceitfully to placate her by saying, 'I keep seeing a vision of a certain angel called Gabriel, and being unable to bear his sight, I faint and fall down.'

=== Niketas ===
In the work A History of Christian-Muslim Relations, Hugh Goddard mentions both John of Damascus and Theophanes and goes on to consider the relevance of Niketas Byzantios who formulated replies to letters on behalf of Emperor Michael III (r. 842–867). Goddard sums up Niketas' view:

In short, Muhammad was an ignorant charlatan who succeeded by imposture in seducing the ignorant barbarian Arabs into accepting a gross, blaspheming, idolatrous, demoniac religion, which is full of futile errors, intellectual enormities, doctrinal errors and moral aberrations.

Goddard further argues that Niketas demonstrates in his work a knowledge of the entire Quran, including an extensive knowledge of Suras 2–18. Niketas' account from behind the Byzantine frontier apparently set a strong precedent for later writing both in tone and points of argument.

=== 11th century ===
Knowledge and depictions of Islam continued to be varied within the Christian West during the 11th century. For instance, the author(s) of the 11th century Song of Roland evidently had little actual knowledge of Islam. As depicted in this epic poem, Muslims erect statues of Mohammed and worship them, and Mohammed is part of an "Unholy Trinity" together with the Classical Greek Apollyon and Termagant, a completely fictional deity. This view, evidently confusing Islam with the pre-Christian Graeco-Roman Religion, appears to reflect misconceptions prevalent in Western Christian society at the time.

On the other hand, ecclesiastic writers such as Amatus of Montecassino or Geoffrey Malaterra in Norman Southern Italy, who occasionally lived among Muslims themselves, would depict at times Muslims in a negative way but would depict equally any other (ethnic) group that was opposed to the Norman rule such as Byzantine Greeks or Italian Lombards. Often the depictions would depend on context: when writing about neutral events, Muslims would be called according to geographical terms such as "Saracens" or "Sicilians, when reporting events where Muslims came into conflict with Normans, Muslims would be called "pagans" or "infidels".

Similarities were occasionally acknowledged such as by Pope Gregory VII wrote in a letter to the Hammadid emir an-Nasir that both Christians and Muslims "worship and confess the same God though in diverse forms and daily praise".

=== The Divine Comedy ===
In Dante Alighieri's Divine Comedy, Muhammad is in the ninth ditch of Malebolge, the eighth realm, designed for those who have caused schism; specifically, he was placed among the Sowers of Religious Discord. Muhammad is portrayed as split in half, with his entrails hanging out, representing his status as a heresiarch (Canto 28).

This scene is frequently shown in illustrations of the Divine Comedy. Muhammad is represented in a 15th-century fresco Last Judgment by Giovanni da Modena and drawing on Dante, in the San Petronio Basilica in Bologna, as well as in artwork by Salvador Dalí, Auguste Rodin, William Blake, and Gustave Doré.

== Catholic Church and Islam ==
=== Second Vatican Council and Nostra aetate ===
The question of Islam was not on the agenda when Nostra aetate was first drafted, or even at the opening of the Second Vatican Council. However, as in the case of the question of Judaism, several events came together again to prompt a consideration of Islam. By the time of the Second Session of the Council in 1963, reservations began to be raised by bishops of the Middle East about the inclusion of this question. The position was taken that either the question will not be raised at all, or if it were raised, some mention of the Muslims should be made. Melkite patriarch Maximos IV was among those pushing for this latter position.

Early in 1964, Cardinal Bea notified Cardinal Cicognani, President of the Council's Coordinating Commission, that the Council fathers wanted the Council to say something about the great monotheistic religions, and in particular about Islam. The subject, however, was deemed to be outside the competence of Bea's Secretariat for the Promotion of Christian Unity. Bea expressed willingness to "select some competent people and with them to draw up a draft" to be presented to the Coordinating Commission. At a meeting of the Coordinating Commission on 16–17 April Cicognani acknowledged that it would be necessary to speak of the Muslims.

The period between the first and second sessions saw the change of pontiff from Pope John XXIII to Pope Paul VI, who had been a member of the circle (the Badaliya) of the Islamologist Louis Massignon. Pope Paul VI chose to follow the path recommended by Maximos IV and he therefore established commissions to introduce what would become paragraphs on the Muslims in two different documents, one of them being Nostra aetate, paragraph three, the other being Lumen gentium, paragraph 16.

The text of the final draft bore traces of Massignon's influence. The reference to Mary, for example, resulted from the intervention of Monsignor Descuffi, the Latin archbishop of Smyrna with whom Massignon collaborated in reviving the cult of Mary at Smyrna. The commendation of Muslim prayer may reflect the influence of the Badaliya.

In Lumen gentium, the Second Vatican Council declares that the plan of salvation also includes Muslims, due to their professed monotheism.

=== Recent Catholic-Islamic controversies ===
- For the controversy surrounding Muslim prayer in Spain, see Muslim campaign at Córdoba Cathedral
- For criticism of interfaith dialogue with Muslims, see Pierre Claverie#Relations with Islam
- For the controversy over whether Islam is a religion or a political system, see Raymond Leo Burke#Islam and immigration
- For the controversy over advice not to marry a Muslim and move to an Islamic country, see José Policarpo#Marriages with Muslim men
- For the controversy over whether Catholics may call God "Allah" if they want to, see Titular Roman Catholic Archbishop of Kuala Lumpur v Menteri Dalam Negeri
- For the controversy over remarks by Pope Benedict XVI, see Regensburg lecture and Pope Benedict XVI and Islam

== Protestantism and Islam ==
Protestantism and Islam entered into contact during the 16th century, at a time when Protestant movements in northern Europe coincided with the expansion of the Ottoman Empire in southern Europe. As both were in conflict with the Catholic Holy Roman Empire, numerous exchanges occurred, exploring religious similarities and the possibility of trade and military alliances. Relations became more conflictual in the early modern and modern periods, although recent attempts have been made at rapprochement.

== Mormonism and Islam ==
Mormonism and Islam have been compared to one another ever since the earliest origins of the former in the nineteenth century, often by detractors of one religion or the other—or both. For instance, Joseph Smith, the founding prophet of Mormonism, was referred to as "the modern Mahomet" by the New York Herald, shortly after his murder in June 1844. This epithet repeated a comparison that had been made from Smith's earliest career, one that was not intended at the time to be complimentary. Comparison of the Mormon and Muslim prophets still occurs today, sometimes for derogatory or polemical reasons but also for more scholarly and neutral purposes. While Mormonism and Islam certainly have many similarities, there are also significant, fundamental differences between the two religions. Mormon-Muslim relations have historically been cordial; recent years have seen increasing dialogue between adherents of the two faiths, and cooperation in charitable endeavors, especially in the Middle and Far East.

== Cultural influences ==
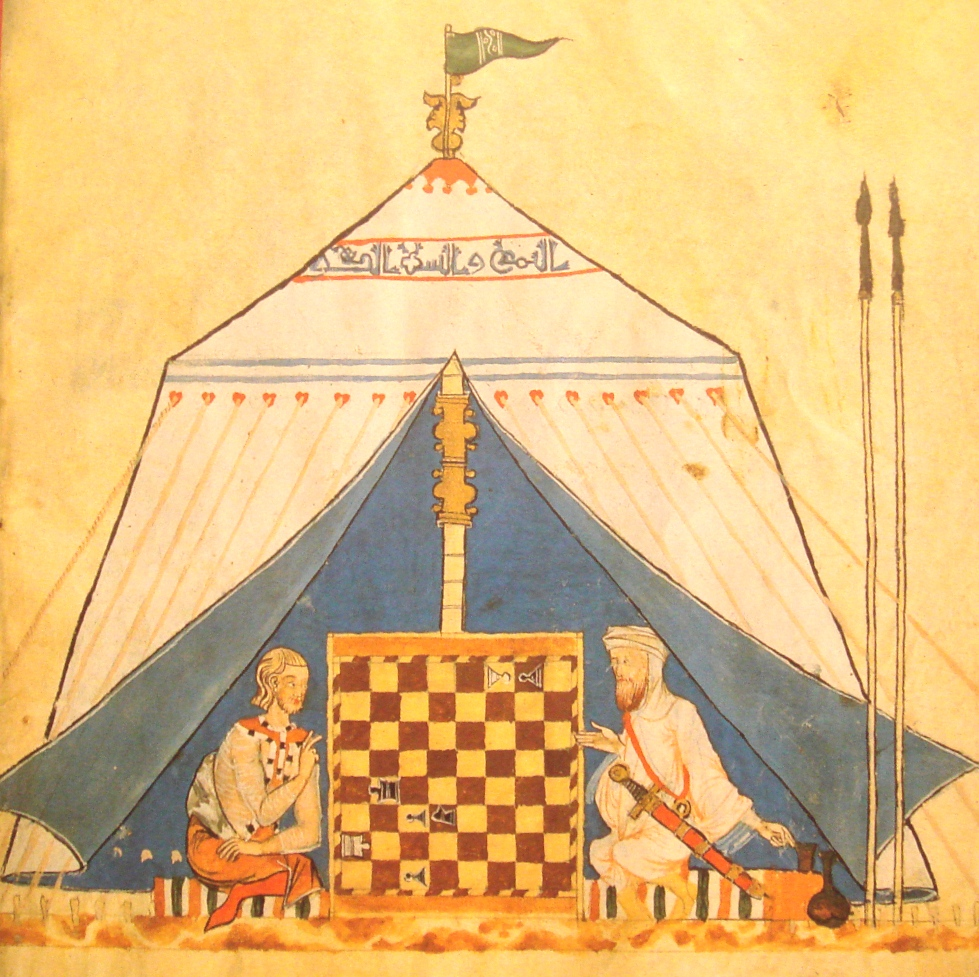
A Christian and a Muslim playing chess, illustration from the Book of Games of Alfonso X (c. 1285)

Scholars and intellectuals agree Christians have made significant contributions to Arab and Islamic civilization since the introduction of Islam, and they have had a significant impact contributing the culture of the Middle East and North Africa and other areas. Eastern Christian scientists and scholars of the medieval Islamic world (particularly Nestorian Christians) contributed to the Arab Islamic civilization during the Umayyad and the Abbasid periods by translating works of Greek philosophers to Syriac and afterwards to Arabic. They also excelled in philosophy, science, theology and medicine. Byzantine science played an important and crucial role in the transmission of classical knowledge to the Islamic world.

During the High Middle Ages, the Islamic world was at its cultural peak, supplying information and ideas to Europe, via Al-Andalus, Sicily and the Crusader kingdoms in the Levant. These included Latin translations of the Greek Classics and of Arabic texts in astronomy, mathematics, science, and medicine. Translation of Arabic philosophical texts into Latin "led to the transformation of almost all philosophical disciplines in the medieval Latin world", with a particularly strong influence of Muslim philosophers being felt in natural philosophy, psychology and metaphysics. The Islamic world also influenced other aspects of medieval European culture, partly by original innovations made during the Islamic Golden Age, including various fields such as the arts, agriculture, alchemy, music, pottery, etc.

=== Artistic influences ===
Islamic art and culture have both influenced and been influenced by Christian art and culture. Some arts have received such influence strongly, particularly religious architecture in the Byzantine and medieval eras.

== See also ==
- Ashtiname of Muhammad
- Chrislam (Yoruba), a syncretist religion
- Muslim-Christian Associations, Palestinian nationalism
- Christian influences in Islam
- Christian philosophy
- Christianity and other religions
- Christianity and war
- Crusades
- Constantinople
- Divisions of the world in Islam
- Islam and other religions
- Islamic philosophy
- Islam and war
- Muhammad's views on Christians
