= Shams al-Din Muhammad Tabadkani =

Sufi master (died 1486)

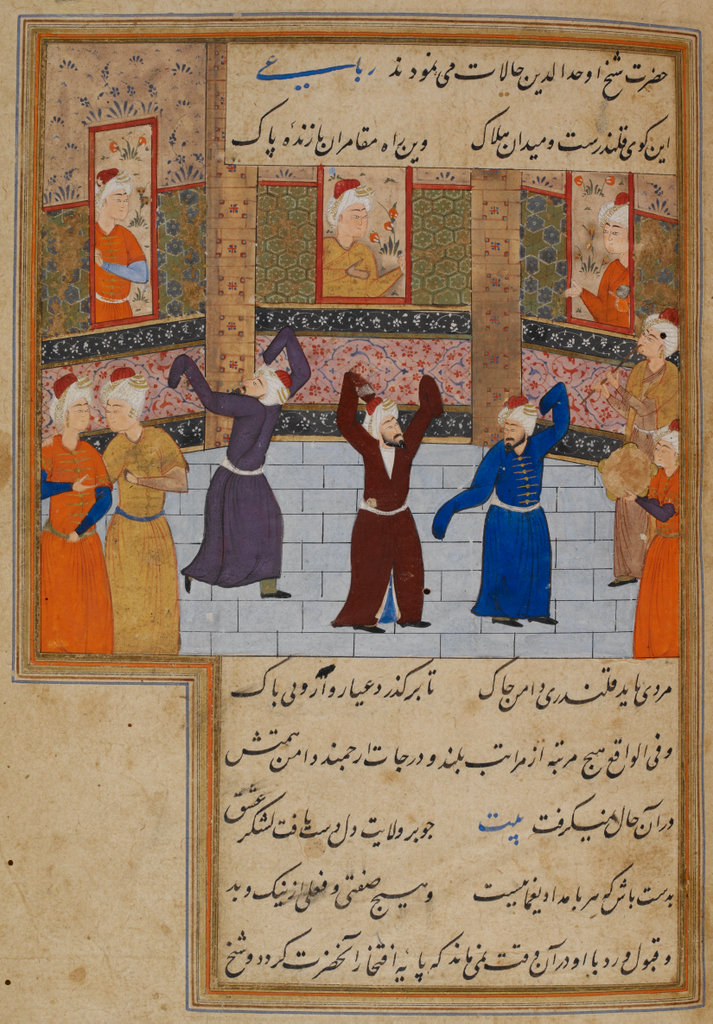
Muhammad Tabadkani dancing with dervishes. Folio from the Majalis al-'ushshaq of Kamal al-Din Gazurgahi, created in Shiraz, dated c. 1560

Shams al-Din Muhammad Tabadkani (died 1486) was an important Sufi master.
