= Islamic view of the Trinity =

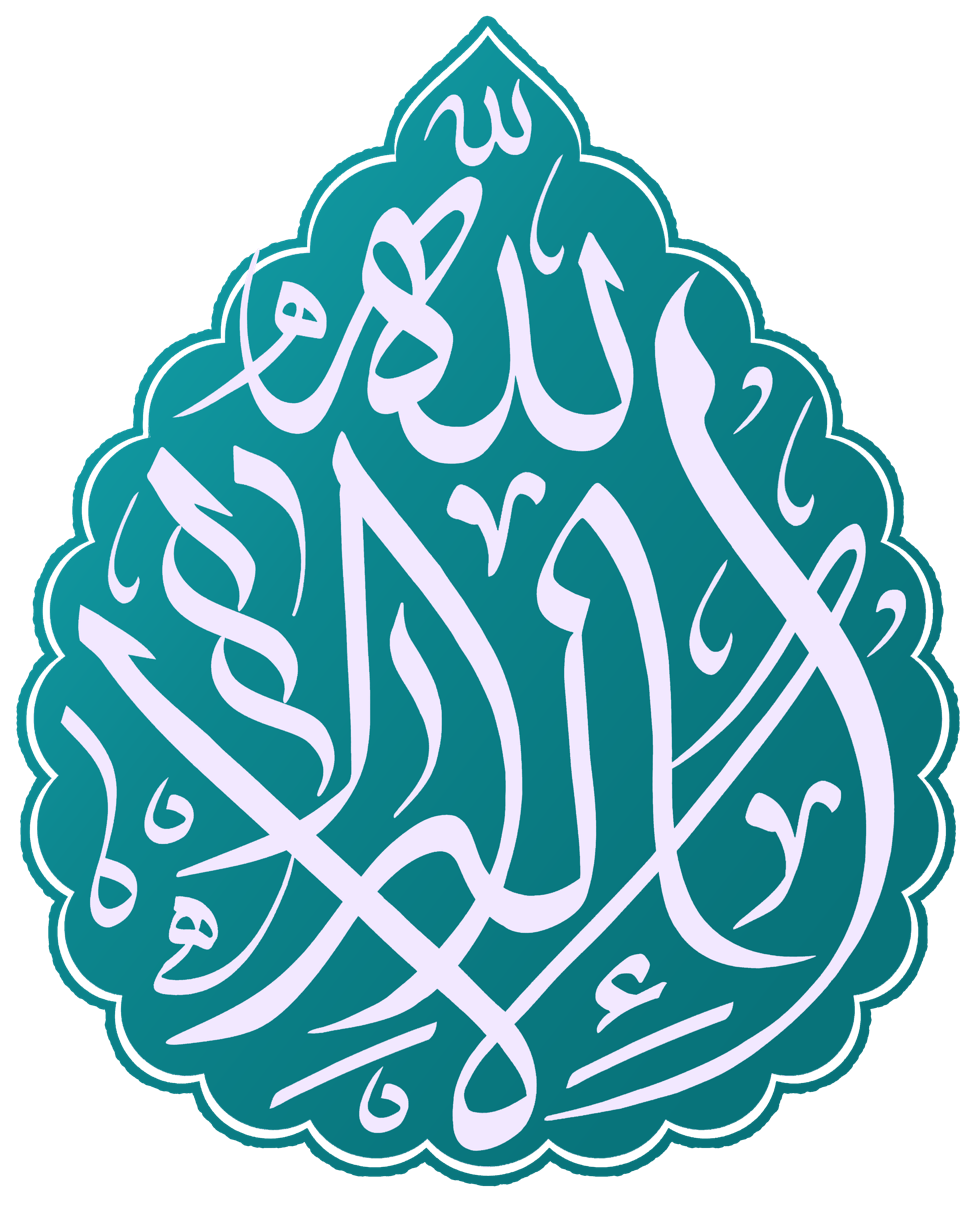
A drawing of the phrase "There is no god except God" (لا إلٰه إلا الله).

Muslims have explicitly rejected Christian doctrines of the Trinity from an early date. In Christianity, the doctrine of the Trinity states that God is a single essence in which three distinct hypostases ("persons"): the Father, the Son, the Holy Spirit, exist consubstantially and co-eternally as a perichoresis. Islam considers the concept of any "plurality" within God to be a denial of Tawhid or monotheism. Tawhid is Islam's central and single most important concept, upon which a Muslim's entire religious adherence rests. Shirk, the act of ascribing partners to God – whether they be sons, daughters, or other partners – is considered to be a form of unbelief in Islam and is considered as the worst sin. The Quran repeatedly and firmly asserts God's absolute oneness, thus ruling out the possibility of another being sharing his sovereignty or nature. In Islam, the Holy Spirit is believed to be the angel Gabriel.

== Verses in the Quran ==
Three Quranic verses may directly refer to this doctrine, 4:171, 5:73, and 5:116.

O People of the Book! Do not go to extremes regarding your faith; say nothing about Allah except the truth. The Messiah, Jesus, son of Mary, was no more than a messenger of Allah and the fulfilment of His Word through Mary and a spirit created by a command from Him. So believe in Allah and His messengers and do not say, “Trinity.” Stop!—for your own good. Allah is only One God. Glory be to Him! He is far above having a son! To Him belongs whatever is in the heavens and whatever is on the earth. And Allah is sufficient as a Trustee of Affairs.

— Surah An-Nisa 4:171

5:17-In blasphemy indeed are those that say that Allah is Christ the son of Mary. Say: "Who then hath the least power against Allah, if His will were to destroy Christ the son of Mary, his mother, and all every – one that is on the earth? For to Allah belongeth the dominion of the heavens and the earth, and all that is between. He createth what He pleaseth. For Allah hath power over all things."

5:72 Those who say, “Allah is the Messiah, son of Mary,” have certainly fallen into disbelief. The Messiah himself said, “O Children of Israel! Worship Allah—my Lord and your Lord.” Whoever associates others with Allah in worship will surely be forbidden Paradise by Allah. Their home will be the Fire. And the wrongdoers will have no helpers.
5:73 Those who say, “Allah is one in a Trinity,” have certainly fallen into disbelief. There is only One God. If they do not stop saying this, those who disbelieve among them will be afflicted with a painful punishment.
5:74 Will they not turn to Allah in repentance and seek His forgiveness? And Allah is All-Forgiving, Most Merciful.
5:75 The Messiah, son of Mary, was no more than a messenger. Many messengers had come and gone before him. His mother was a woman of truth. They both ate food. See how We make the signs clear to them, yet see how they are deluded from the truth!

— Quran 5:72–75

5:116 And on Judgment Day, Allah will say, “O Jesus, son of Mary! Did you ever ask the people to worship you and your mother as gods besides Allah?” He will answer, “Glory be to You! How could I ever say what I had no right to say? If I had said such a thing, you would have certainly known it. You know what is hidden within me, but I do not know what is within You. Indeed, You alone are the Knower of all unseen.
5:117 I never told them anything except what You ordered me to say: “Worship Allah—my Lord and your Lord!” And I was witness over them as long as I remained among them. But when You took me, You were the Witness over them—and You are a Witness over all things.
5:118 If You punish them, they belong to You after all. But if You forgive them, You are surely the Almighty, All-Wise.”

— Quran 5:116–118

Furthermore, verses 19:88–93, 23:91 and 112:1–4 are relevant to the doctrine of "Trinity":

19:88 They say, "The Most Compassionate has offspring."
19:89 You have certainly made an outrageous claim,
19:90 by which the heavens are about to burst, the earth to split apart, and the mountains to crumble to pieces
19:91 in protest of attributing children to the Most Compassionate.
19:92 It does not befit the majesty of the Most Compassionate to have children.
19:93 There is none in the heavens or the earth who will not return to the Most Compassionate in full submission.

— Surah Maryam 19:88-93

Allah has never had any offspring, nor is there any god besides Him. Otherwise, each god would have taken away what he created, and they would have tried to dominate one another. Glorified is Allah above what they claim!

— Surah Al-Mu'minun 23:91

Say, O Prophet, "He is Allah—One and Indivisible; Allah—the Sustainer needed by all. He has never had offspring, nor was He born. And there is none comparable to Him.”

— Surah Al-Ikhlas 112:1–4

== Interpretation ==
Interpretation of these verses by modern scholars has been varied. Although the latter group of verses have usually been taken to reject the mainstream Christian view of Jesus as son of God, Watt has argued that they refer specifically to an unorthodox notion of "physical sonship".^{:47}

Verse 5:73 has been interpreted as a potential criticism of Syriac literature that references Jesus as "the third of three" and thus an attack on the view that Christ was divine. Hence, verses 5:72–75 may merely be criticizing the idea that Jesus and God are the same. Alternatively, it may be a purposeful simplification of the Christian belief in the humanity and divinity of Christ in order to expose its potential weakness when viewed from the firmly monotheistic position of Islam.^{:47}

Similarly, verse 4:171 can be read as a rejection of Jesus' divinity. It is worth noting that in explaining these verses, early Muslim Quranic commentators noted that "the Christian 'three' was an internal characteristic of the godhead... rather than a series of external beings placed together with God."

Some Muslim commentators believe 5:116 as referring to Mary as part of the Christian Trinity referring to the worship of both Jesus and Mary as gods. (Note: Muslim apologists argue that the commentators are referring only to a certain Christian sect and not to all of them.) Critics use this to argue that the Quran's author was mistaken about orthodox Christian beliefs, wherein Mary is a human, and the third person of the Trinity is the Holy Spirit.

On the other hand, Muslims argue that past Collyridian Christians have explicitly believed Mary to be a divine being. However some historians, such as Averil Cameron, have been skeptical about whether Collyridians even existed and noted that Epiphanius is the only source for the group and that later authors simply refer to his text. There is no further proof that such a sect ever existed and it is very unlikely that they existed in the 7th century. Others argue that Q5:116 in fact does not allude to the Trinity since the term itself isn't stated in the verse and instances where the Trinity is explicitly mentioned (Q4:171 and 5:73), Mary's alleged divine status is not noted. Some recent Western scholarship support a rhetorical understanding of the Quranic accusation of Mary's divinity claim in Q5:116;^{:47} (Note: Sirry writes: "In more recent scholarship of the Qur'an, as represented by the works of Hawting, Sidney Griffith and Gabriel Reynolds, there is a shift from the 'heretical explanation' to the emphasis on the rhetorical language of the Qur'an. ... Griffith states, 'The Qur'an's seeming missstatement, rhetorically speaking, should therefore not be thought to be a mistake, but rather a ... caricature, the purpose of which is to highlight in Islamic terms the absurdity, and therefore the wrongness, of the Christian belief, from an islamic perspective.' ... Reynolds persuasively argues that 'in passages involving Christianity in the Qur'an we should look for the Qur'an's creative use of rhetoric, and not for the influence of Christian heretics.'") arguing the verse generally gives an example of Shirk and admonishes it. (Note: Neuwirth, David Thomas, Griffith, Gabriel Reynolds, and Mun'im Sirry emphasise this rhetorical interpretation.^{:47} Edward Hulmes writes: "The Qur'anic interpretation of trinitarian orthodoxy as belief in the Father, the Son, and the Virgin Mary, may owe less to a misunderstanding of the New Testament itself than to a recognition of the role accorded by local Christians to Mary as mother in a special sense.")

Insofar as Islam developed as a simplification, restoration, or reformation of various Abrahamic traditions and practices, the purely monotheistic Islamic rejection of any form of Trinitarian doctrine can function as a rejection or evasion of the fierce controversies on the Trinity that beset the early Christian churches and which had led to repeated schisms, especially evident in Muhammad's milieu.

== See also ==
- Christianity and Islam
- Christology
- Collyridianism
- Islamic views on Jesus' death
- Logos (Islam)
- Muhammad's views on Christians
- Rūḥ
- Shahada
- Tawhid
