= Imad al-Din Mahmud Junabadi =

Imad al-Din Mahmud Junabadi (Persian: عمادالدین محمود جنابادی; 2 January 1415 – 1450s) was an Iranian bureaucrat, who served as a financial officer and vizier under the Timurid Empire. The son of Sayyid Zayn al-Abidin Junabadi, he belonged to a sayyid family from the town of Junabad in Quhistan, where they also owned land.

After the death of his father in 1425/6, Imad al-Din entered the service of Shah Rukh (r. 1405–1447), and in 1443 was appointed the financial accountant of the city of Balkh by the latter's powerful amir Jalal al-Din Firuzshah. Informed of embezzlement by the deputies of Balkh, Shah Rukh secretly selected Imad al-Din to investigate the situation.

With the help of Shah Rukh's son Muhammad Juki (who had access to the matters of the deputies), Imad al-Din successfully exposed the misappropriation of the revenues, and in 1444 presented the matter to Shah Rukh. After the death of Shah Rukh in 1447, Imad al-Din entered the service of the latter's son and successor Ulugh Beg (r. 1447–1449), eventually becoming his vizier in 1448. Imad al-Din is later recorded as one of the divanian (high-ranking officials) of Abdal-Latif Mirza (r. 1449–1450) and Abul-Qasim Babur Mirza (r. 1449–1449, 1450–1457). According to the historian Sayf al-Din Uqayli, he also served Mirza Sultan Sanjar during the reign of Abul-Qasim Babur Mirza, but soon died afterwards.

== Sources ==
- Manz, Beatrice Forbes (2020). "Iranian Elites under the Timurids". In Steenbergen, Jo Van (ed.). Trajectories of State Formation across Fifteenth-Century Islamic West-Asia. Brill. pp. 257–282. ISBN 978-9004431300.
- Ando, Shiro (2002). "Gonābādi, ʿEmād-al-Din Moḥammad". Encyclopædia Iranica, Vol. XI, online edition, Fasc. 2. New York. p. 122.
