= Abu al-Abbas al-Nahawandi =

10th-century Sufi mystic Muslim scholar

Qutb al-Ariffin Abu al-Abbas al-Nahawandi

Personal life
- Born: Ahmad ibn Muhammad ibn Fadl al-Nahawandi; 10th century Nahavand, Iran
- Died: 1010 Nahavand, Iran
- Resting place: Tomb of Abu al-Abbas al-Nahawandi, Nahavand, Iran

Religious life
- Religion: Islam
- Denomination: Sunni Islam
- Tariqa: Independent
- Creed: Athari

Muslim leader
- Disciple of: Sheikh Ja'far Khalidi

Abu al-Abbas al-Nahawandi (Persian: ابوالعباس نهاوندی died 1010), full name Ahmad ibn Muhammad ibn Fadl al-Nahawandi, was a 10th-century Muslim Sufi mystic who lived in Nahavand, Iran. He is known amongst followers of Sufism as a trustworthy spiritual companion and an experienced elder in Islamic mysticism. Nahawandi was a companion of Baba Kuhi of Shiraz.

== Life ==
Abu al-Abbas al-Nahawandi was born in the 10th century in Nahavand.

His year of birth is not known, but is said to have been in the late half of the 10th century. He was a contemporary of the Buyid ruler 'Adud al-Dawla. Nahawandi later moved to Baghdad temporarily to complete his spiritual journey.

Nahawandi also became a disciple of Sheikh Ja'far Khalidi, who was in turn a disciple of Junayd of Baghdad. Nahawandi was also a good friend of Baba Kuhi, and they conversed a lot together. He spent twelve years of his life in asceticism. The exploits and miracles of Nahawandi are mentioned by later Sufi mystics, like Abdullah Ansari, Attar of Nishapur and Abd al-Rahman Jami' in their biographical works.

Abu al-Abbas al-Nahawandi died in the early 11th century. His death date is not completely known, however some scholars have stated that he died in the year 1010. He was buried in the Darb Shaykh neighbourhood of Nahavand.

== Tomb ==
During the Qajar period, a mausoleum was built over Nahawandi's grave. It is a quadrilateral building with an area of 39 square metres and a height of 3.5 metres. The building was at one point a place of pilgrimage, however in recent times it became dilapidated and ignored. The building was subsequently closed, until 2015 when restoration works were done. After the restoration, the mausoleum was reopened and visitors were allowed in. It is currently a national heritage monument of Iran.

== See also ==
- List of Sufi saints
