= Shirk (Islam) =

Islamic concept of associating other objects with God

In Islam, Shirk (Arabic: شِرْك, lit. 'association') is a sin often roughly translated as "idolatry" or "polytheism", but more accurately meaning "partnerism or association [with God]". (Note: These translations have been criticized by Nicolai Sinai as inaccurate. According to him, the terms idolatry and polytheism have a narrow definition of worshipping images, betraying the Quranic meaning. In the Quran, those who commit shirk may place an idol, but the sin itself consists of associating something with God.) It refers to accepting other divinities or powers alongside God as associates. In contrast, Islam teaches that God does not share divine attributes with anyone, as it is disallowed according to the Islamic doctrine of tawhid. The Quran—the central religious text of Islam—states in Surah an-Nisa, that God will not forgive shirk if one dies without repenting of it.

The one who commits shirk is called a mushrik. (Note: Arabic: مُشْرِك, romanized: mushrik, lit. 'associator'; pl. مُشْرِكُون, mushrikūn) The opposite of shirk is tawhid (Note: Arabic: تَوْحِيد, romanized: tawḥīd, lit. 'monotheism') and the opposite of mushrik is muwahhid. (Note: Arabic: مُوَحِّد, romanized: muwaḥḥid, lit. 'monotheist'; pl. مُوَحِّدُون, muwaḥḥidūn)

== Etymology ==
The word shirk comes from the Arabic root sh-r-k (ش ر ك), with the general meaning of "to share". (Note: The term must not be confused with the English verb "to shirk", meaning to avoid, which is of quite separate origin, possibly derived from the German word for knave or rogue (Scharke).) In the context of the Quran, the particular sense of "sharing as an equal partner" is usually understood, so that polytheism means "attributing a partner to God". In the Quran, shirk and the related word mushrikūn (مشركون)—those who commit shirk and plot against Islam—often refer to the enemies of Islam (as in al-Tawbah verses 9:1–15), though there is no equal in the English language.

== Quran ==
According to the Encyclopaedia of Islam (2nd edition), the Quran states twice in an-Nisa verses 48 and 116 that God can forgive all sins save one: shirk.

Indeed, Allah does not forgive associating others with Him, but forgives anything else of whoever He wills. And whoever associates others with Allah has indeed committed a grave sin.

— Q4:48

Islamic commentators on the Quran have emphasized that a number of pre-Islamic Arabian deities and jinn, most notably the three goddesses Manat, al-Lat, and al-Uzza mentioned in the surah an-Najm, were considered associates of God.

Entities worshipped besides God are called shurakāʾ (Arabic: شُرَكَاء). After Judgement Day, they will be cast into Jahannam (Hell) along with devils (fallen angels) and evil jinn, to whom the polytheists are said to sacrifice in order to gain protection.

Charles Adams writes that the Quran reproaches the People of the Book with kufr for rejecting Muhammad's message when they should have been the first to accept it as possessors of earlier revelations, and singles out Christians for disregarding the evidence of God's unity. The Quranic verse al-Ma'idah 5:73 ("Certainly they disbelieve [kafara] who say: God is the third of three"), among other verses, has been traditionally understood in Islam as rejection of the Christian Trinity doctrine, but modern scholarship has suggested alternative interpretations. (Note: That this verse criticizes a deviant form of Trinitarian belief which overstressed distinctiveness of the three persons at the expense of their unity. Modern scholars have also interpreted it as a reference to Jesus, who was often called "the third of three" in Syriac literature and as an intentional over-simplification of Christian doctrine intended to highlight its weakness from a strictly monotheistic perspective.) Other Quranic verses strongly deny the divinity of Jesus, the son of Mary, and reproach the people who treat Jesus as equal with God as disbelievers, who will be doomed to eternal punishment in Hell. The Quran also does not recognise the attribute of Jesus as the Son of God or God himself but respects Jesus as a prophet and messenger of God, who was sent to children of Israel.

Some Muslim thinkers, such as Mohamed Talbi, have viewed the most extreme Quranic presentations of the dogmas of the Trinity and divinity of Jesus (al-Ma'idah 5:19, 5:75-76, 5:119) as non-Christian formulas, which were rejected by the Christian Church, as well.

Cyril Glasse criticises the use of kafirun (sing. kafir) to describe Christians as a "loose usage". According to the Encyclopaedia of Islam, traditional Islamic jurisprudence has ahl al-kitab being "usually regarded more leniently than other kuffar (pl. of kafir)," and "in theory," a Muslim commits a punishable offense if he says to a Jew or a Christian: "Thou unbeliever."

Historically, People of the Book permanently residing under Islamic rule were entitled to a special status known as dhimmi, and those who were visiting Muslim lands received a different status known as musta'min. In the Quran, Jews and Christians—though accused of believing in shared divinity by asserting lineage between God and Ezra or Jesus, respectively—are not described as mushrik. The term is reserved for pre-Islamic beliefs that associated partners with God. Nonetheless, medieval Muslim philosophers identified belief in the Trinity with shirk ("associationism"), by limiting the infinity of God by associating his divinity with physical existence.

== Theological interpretation ==
In a theological context, one commits shirk by associating some lesser being with God (Allah). The sin is committed if one imagines that there is another power associated with Allah as a partner. It is stated in the Quran:

"Allah forgives not that partners should be set up with Him, but He forgives anything else, to whom He pleases, to set up partners with Allah is to devise a sin most heinous indeed"

—Quran, an-Nisa, 4:48

The term is often translated as polytheism, but it is more complex than that. The term also implies that humans need to renounce claiming divine status for themselves by regarding themselves as better than others. Besides worshipping only one God, it also postulates that God must be considered as entirely unique and condemns anthropomorphization. Shirk further implies that God's attributes cannot be associated with any other entity or that any other entity can exist independent from God. At the same time, shirk contains additional assumptions not entailed by the concept of idolatry and does not require a physical object of worship.

=== Forms of shirk ===
Shirk is classified into two categories:

- Shirk al-akbar (Arabic: شِرْك ٱلْأَكْبَر, romanized: shirk al-akbar; lit. 'greater shirk'): open and apparent
- Shirk al-asghar or al-shirk al-khafi (Arabic: شِرْك ٱلْأَصْغَر, romanized: shirk al-aṣghar; lit. 'lesser shirk'): concealed or hidden. It is when people perform the necessary rituals, not for God but for the sake of others, including social recognition. Hidden shirk might be unwitting, yet punishable, although to a lesser extent than greater forms of shirk.

=== Ash-Shirk al-Akbar ===
Ash-Shirk al-Akbar (Arabic:الشرك الأكبر) is defined as the most major type of open association. It has been described in four forms:

==== Shirk-ad-Du'a ====
Shirk-ad-Du'a (Arabic: شِرْكُ الدُّعَاءِ) is when one invokes or prays to any being other than God. The Quran says in Al-Ankabut V. 65:

If they happen to be aboard a ship ˹caught in a storm˺, they cry out to Allah ˹alone˺ in sincere devotion. But as soon as He delivers them ˹safely˺ to shore, they associate ˹others with Him once again˺.

— Mustafa Khattab, The Clear Quran,

==== Shirk-al-Niyyah wal-Irada wal Qasd ====
Shirk-al-Niyyah wal-Irada wal Qasd (Arabic: الشرك في النية والإرادة والقصد) is when one has the intention, purpose and determination to perform an act of worship or good deed for the sake of other deities than God.

==== Shirk-at-Ta'a ====
Shirk-at-Ta'a (Arabic: شرك الطاعة) is when one obeys any other religious authority against the orders of God. Regarding this, the Quran says in At-Tawbah V. 31:

They have taken their rabbis and monks as well as the Messiah, son of Mary, as lords besides Allah, even though they were commanded to worship none but One God. There is no god ˹worthy of worship˺ except Him. Glorified is He above what they associate ˹with Him˺!

— Mustafa Khattab, The Clear Quran

==== Shirk-al-Muhabbah ====
Shirk-al-Muhabbah (Arabic: شرك المحبة) is when shows love to others which is due to God. This is seen in Al-Baqarah V. 165:

Still there are some who take others as Allah’s equal—they love them as they should love Allah—but the ˹true˺ believers love Allah even more. If only the wrongdoers could see the ˹horrible˺ punishment ˹awaiting them˺, they would certainly realize that all power belongs to Allah and that Allah is indeed severe in punishment.

— Mustafa Khattab, The Clear Quran

=== Shirk al-asghar ===
Shirk al-asghar (Arabic: شرك الأصغر) may be committed by one who professes tawhid, but for the sake of others.

One who offers the ritual prayers in an ostentatious way is a polytheist. One who keeps the fast, or gives alms, or performs the hajj to show the public his righteousness or to earn good name is a polytheist.

— Sayyed Qasim Mujtaba Moosavi Kamoonpuri

Mahmud ibn Lubayd reported:

Allah's messenger said: "The thing I fear for you the most is ash-Shirk al-Asghar."

The companions asked, "O Messenger of Allah, what is that?"

He replied, "Ar-Riya (showing off), for verily Allah will say on the Day of Resurrection when people are receiving their rewards, 'Go to those for whom you were showing off in the material world and see if you can find any reward from them."

Mahmud ibn Lubayd also said:

The Prophet came out and announced, "O people, beware of secret Shirk!"

The people asked, "O Messenger of Allah, what is secret Shirk?"

He replied, "When a man gets up to pray and strives to beautify his prayer because people are looking at him; that is secret Shirk."

Umar ibn al-Khattab narrated that Muhammad said: "Whoever swears by other than Allah has committed an act of kufr or shirk." (graded hasan by Al-Tirmidhi and saheeh by Al-Hakim)

According to Ibn Mas'ud, one of Muhammad's companions said: "That I should swear by Allah upon a lie is more preferable to me than that I should swear by another upon the truth."

== Sufism ==
According to Sufi teachings, to avoid "hidden shirk" (al-shirk al-khafi), it is necessary to focus solely on God and give up one's own will.

Some Sufi scholars even go so far as to describe a belief in free will as a form of shirk. According to such an uncompromising view, beliefs usually accommodated within monotheism, such as that in a personal devil (rather than the unregenerate self deficient in God) as the source of evil, or a belief in the concept of free will, are regarded as beliefs in creative powers other than (i.e., standing beside/external to) God, and are thus equated with shirk.

Abdullah Ansari describes the highest stage of tawhid a human can possess, when the mind becomes fully immersed in the presence of God and understand how all things are put into their proper places.

In Sufism, every action done with an expectation of reward, either in this world or in the hereafter, is considered an act of shirk. Despite that this level of shirk does not entail disbelief, or require repeating the action to follow Islam's legal prescriptions, Sufis work on purification until their thoughts are not dominated by any desire except the pure love of God, which results in pure actions of worship.

== Salafism and Wahhabism ==
Muhammad ibn Abd al-Wahhab, founder of the Wahhabi movement, classified shirk into three main categories. However, ibn Taymiyya is considered to have been the spiritual founder of this distinction.

- tawhid al-rububiyyah (Lordship): the verbal profession that God (Allah) is the sole creator and ruler over the world.
- tawhid al-Asma wa's-Sifat (names and attributes): accepting the attributes of God as written in the Quran without interpretation.
- tawhid al-ibada (servitude): the commitment of religious or spiritual duties to God without intermediaries and that religious or spiritual practises must be limited to Islamic sources.

For abd al-Wahhab, tawhid al-ibada was the decisive factor to determine the identity of a Muslim and also the execution of tawhid al-rububiyyah. Muslims who violated his interpretation of tawhid al-ibada were considered to be "associators" (mushrikūn) and "unbelievers" (kāfirūn).

Building on the legacy of abdl-Wahhab, in the writings of Islamist writers Sayyid Qutb, al-Mawdudu, and Abu Muhammad al-Maqdisi interprete adherences to human-made laws as shirk.

== Religious pluralism ==
The worship of another God besides the Islamic God poses a form of shirk, but whether a foreign deity, even beyond the Abrahamic religions, can be identified with the Islamic God is answered variously.

The supreme deity of the Turks and Mongols was also frequently identified with the Islamic God. Likewise, some Muslim authors identified Brahman with Allah. However, such identifications were less likely to be universally accepted and also frequently challenged.

Amir Khusrau (1253–1325), an iconic scholar of the Delhi Sultanate, shows approval of the Brahmins and even favor over Jews and Christians, since they would not attribute a form or a child to God, but, even if they use stones and celestial bodies as direction of prayers, affirm that God does not bear likeness to any of this. According to the Hanbali scholar al-Jawzi (1116–1201), the tawhid of the Brahmins is immaculate; their unbelief consists in the rejection of prophets and performance of rituals without divine sanction. Al-Biruni, scholar and polymath during the Islamic Golden Age and credited as an early anthropologist, argues that although the common people of India worship idols, the educated people would be "entirely free from worshipping anything but God alone". Besides the number of inclusive reception, most jurists (fuqaha), such as Muslim heresiographer al-Shahrastani, consider them to be polytheists, but nevertheless most scholars granted them the status of a dhimmi.

== See also ==
=== General links ===
- Glossary of Islam
- Outline of Islam
- Index of Islam-related articles
- Islam and blasphemy
- Islamic schools and branches
- Islamic view of the Trinity
- Pre-Islamic Arabia
  - Religion in pre-Islamic Arabia
  - List of pre-Islamic Arabian deities
    - Manat
    - Al-Lat
    - Al-Uzza

=== Terms ===
- Haram
- Zandaqa
- Kafir
- Munafiq
- Shahada
- Taghut
