= Abdullah Ansari =

11th-century Sufi scholar and saint

Abū Ismāʿīl al-Harawī
- أبو إسماعيل الهروي
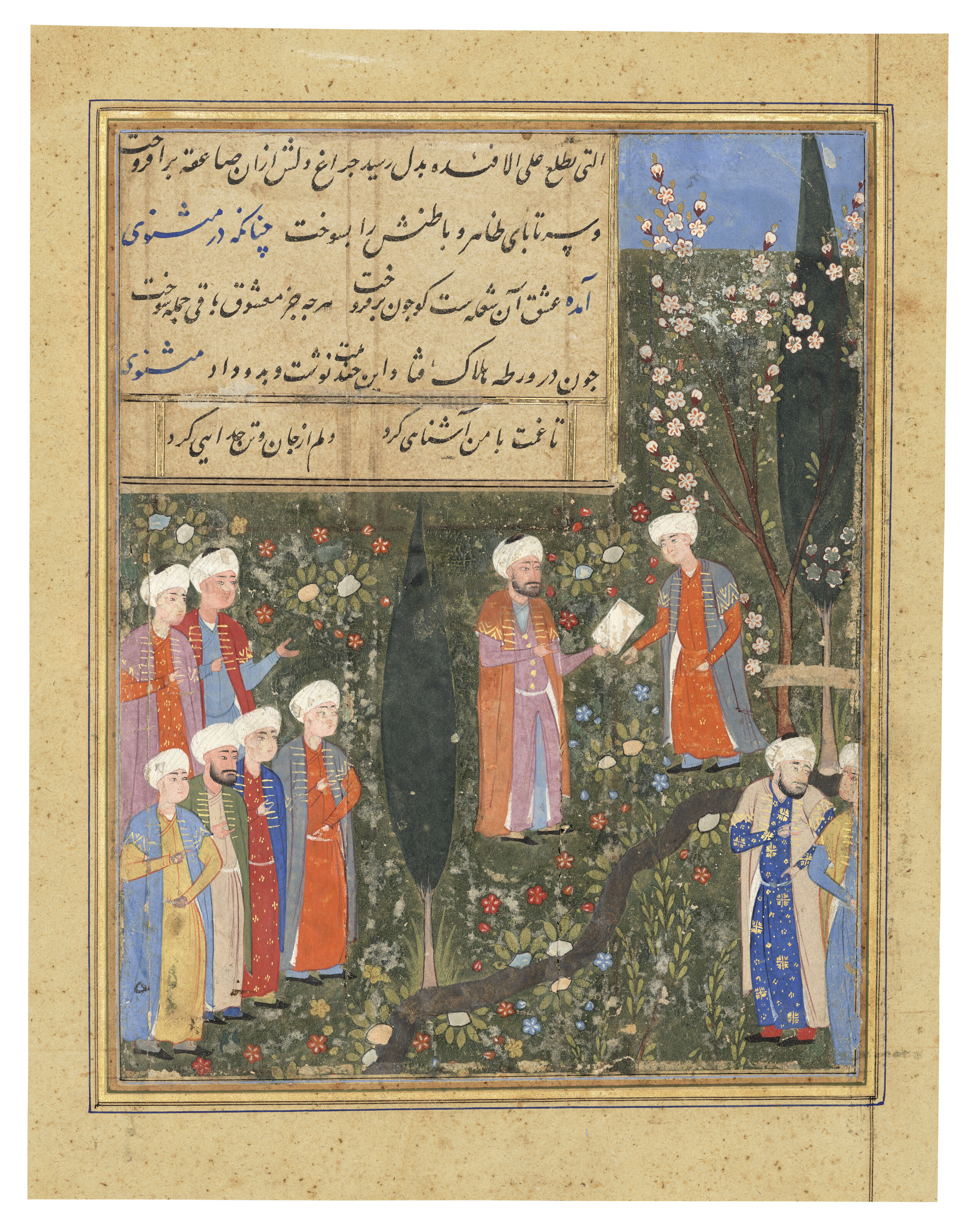
- Abdullah Ansari (holding a book) with Abu Ahmad. Folio from Kamal al-Din Gazurgahi's Majalis al-ushshaq, created in Shiraz, Safavid Iran (modern-day Iran) , second half 16th century
- Title: Shaykh al-Islām, Sage of Herat

Personal life
- Born: May 4, 1006 Herat, Ghaznavid Empire
- Died: 8 March 1089 (aged 82) Herat, Ghaznavid Empire

Religious life
- Religion: Islam
- Denomination: Sunni Islam
- Jurisprudence: Hanbali
- Creed: Athari
- Movement: Sufi

Muslim leader
- Influenced: Ibn Qayyim al-Jawziyya
- Arabic name
- Personal (Ism): ʿAbd Allāh (عبد الله)
- Patronymic (Nasab): Ibn Muḥammad ibn Maaz ibn ʿAlī ibn Muḥammad ibn Aḥmad ibn ʿAlī ibn Jaʿfar ibn Manṣūr ibn Matt ibn Ayyub ibn Abu Ayyub (بن محمد بن علي بن محمد بن أحمد بن علي بن جعفر بن منصور بن مت)
- Teknonymic (Kunya): Abū Ismāʿīl (أبو إسماعيل)
- Toponymic (Nisba): al-Harawī (الهروي)

Abu Ismaïl Abdullah al-Harawi al-Ansari or Abdullah Ansari of Herat (1006–1089) (Persian: خواجه عبدالله انصاری) also known as Pir-i Herat (پیر هرات) "Sage of Herat", was a Sufi saint, who lived in Herat, Ghaznavid Empire (modern-day Afghanistan). Ansari was a commentator on the Qur'an, scholar of the Hanbali school of thought (madhhab), traditionalist, polemicist and spiritual master, known for his oratory and poetic talents in Persian language.

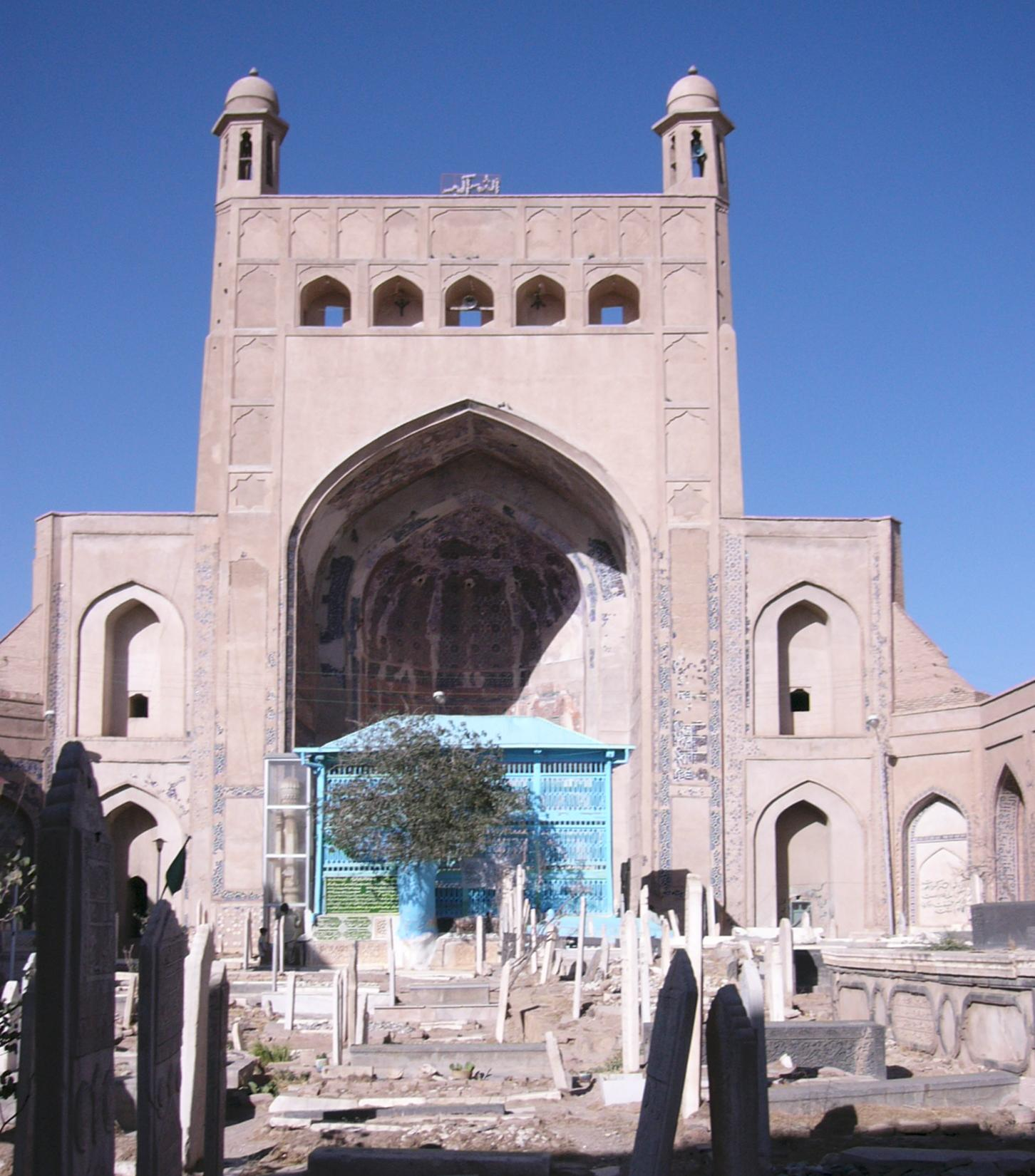
Tomb in Herat, Ghaznavid Empire (modern-day Afghanistan)

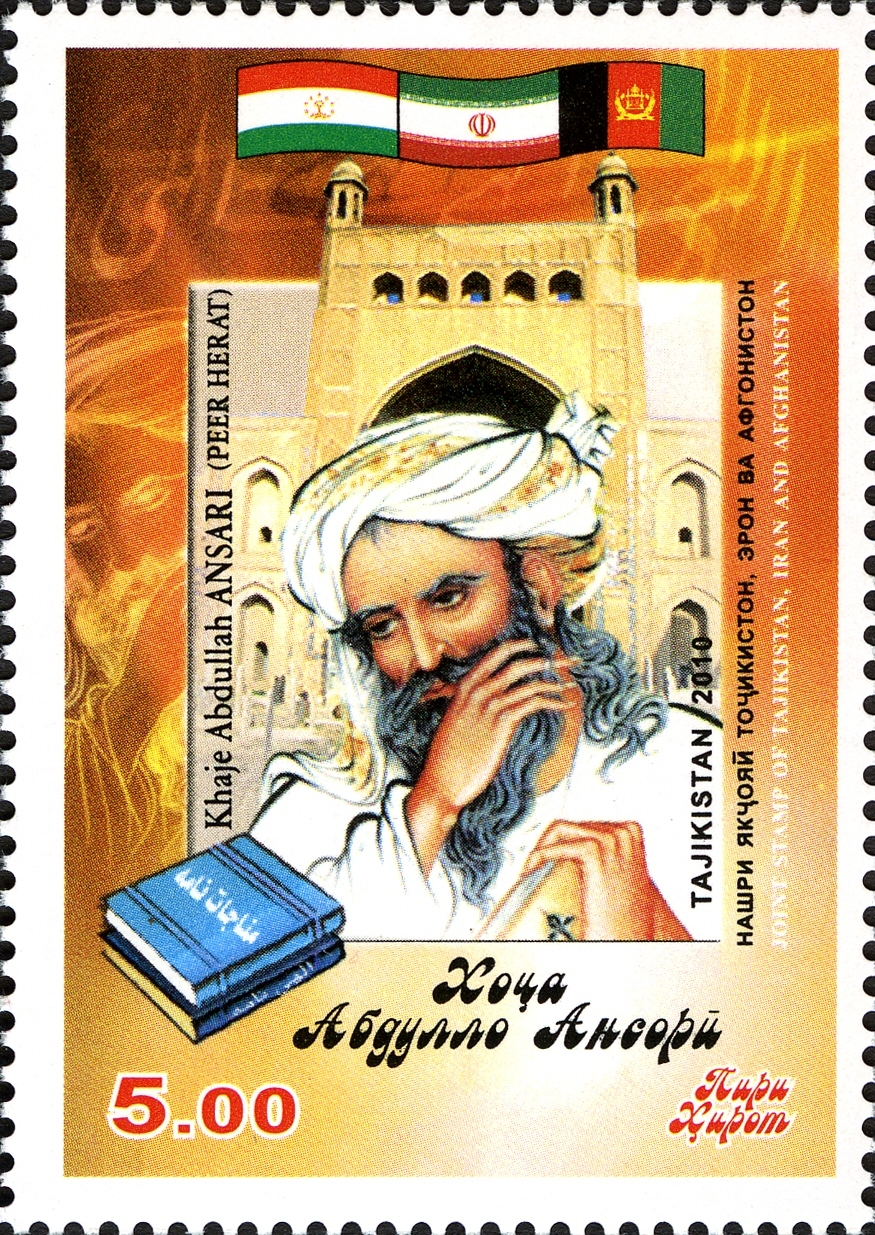
Abdullah Ansari portrayed on a stamp in Tajikistan (2010). Flags of the three Persian speaking countries displayed on top: Iran, Afghanistan, and Tajikistan.

== Life ==
Ansari was born in the Kohandez, the old citadel of Herat, in 1006. His father, Abu Mansur Muhammad, was a shopkeeper who had spent several years of his youth at Balkh.

Ansari was a direct descendant of Abu Ayyub al-Ansari, a companion of the Islamic prophet Muhammad, being the eleventh in line from him. The lineage is described, and traced in the family history records, as follows;

Za’im-i-Bani Najjar Pir-i-Herat Al Imam Al-Zahid Shaykh Al-Islam wa Al-Khorasan Al-Kubra Al-Muhaddith Al- Kabir Mufassir wa Al-Hafiz Al-Quran Khwaja Abu Isma’il ‘Abd-Allah Al-Kandari Al-Harawi Al-Ansari 1006-89 ibn Za’im-i-Bani Najjar Shaikh Khwaja Abu Mansur Muhammad Balkhi Al-Harawi Al-Ansari 966-1025 ibn Za’im-i-Bani Najjar Shaikh Khwaja Maaz Al-Harawi Al-Ansari 923-82 ibn Za’im-i-Bani Najjar Shaikh Khwaja Abu Maaz ‘Ali Al-Harawi Al-Ansari 881-948 ibn Za’im-i-Bani Najjar Shaikh Khwaja Muhammad Al-Harawi Al-Ansari 837-97 ibn Za’im-i-Bani Najjar Shaikh Khwaja Ahmad Al-Harawi Al-Ansari 792-861 ibn Za’im-i-Bani Najjar Shaikh Khwaja ‘Ali Al-Harawi Al-Ansari 756-830 ibn Za’im-i-Bani Najjar Shaikh Khwaja Ja’far Al-Harawi Al-Ansari 722-89 ibn Za’im-i-Bani Najjar Shaikh Khwaja Mansur Al-Harawi Al-Ansari 682-748 ibn Za’im-i-Bani Najjar Shaikh Khwaja Murabit Abu Mansur Samit Muhammad Ghazi Al-Tabi’i Al-Harawi Ummat-Ul-Ansari 634-97 ibn Za’im-i-Bani Najjar Al-Sahaba Shaikh Ayyub Al-Madani Al-Ansari Al-Khazraji Al-Najjari 609-64 ibn Za’im-i-Bani Najjar Al-Sahaba Al-Katib wa Al-Muhaddith Emir Al-Madinah Al-Munawwarah Hafiz Al-Quran Hamil Liwa Al-Islam Al-Ustyriyi Mudif-un-Nabi Mihmandar-i-Rasul-Allah Waqif-i-Masjid Al-Nabawi Al-Tarid Al-Munafiqin Shaikh Abu Ayyub Khalid Ghazi Al-Shaheed Al-Madani Al-Ansari Al-Khazraji Al-Najjari

In the reign of the third Rashid Caliph, Uthman, Abu Mansoor al-Taabi'i took part in the conquest of Khorasan, and subsequently settled in Herat, his descendant Khwajah Abdullah Ansari died there in Dhū al-Ḥijjah 481/February-March 1089.

Ansari was a disciple of Abu al-Hassan al-Kharaqani. He practised the Hanbali school of Sunni jurisprudence. The Shrine of Khwaja Abd Allah, built during the Timurid dynasty, is a popular pilgrimage site. He excelled in the knowledge of Hadith, history and ʻilm al-ansāb (genealogy). He wrote several books on Islamic mysticism and philosophy, in Persian and Arabic.

Abdullah Ansari had 5 children in total: Khwaja Jabir, Khwaja Abdurrahman, Khwaja Hashim Buzurg, Qazi Mohd Yusuf and Qazi Mohd Naimat.

== Descendants ==
The descendants of the sons of Abdullah Ansari had migrated to other regions in South Asia, some remained in Herat. Some settlements of the descendants of Abdullah Ansari are in, Jais(Jayas), Gorakhpur, Yusufpur, Mau, Saharanpur, Punjab, Kakori and the scholars at the famous university in Lucknow, Firangi Mahal.

== Sufism ==
He was one of the first Sufis to write in Persian, which he wrote in a local dialect, thus indicating that he wanted to spread his teachings to the general populace instead of just to the ulama, who knew Arabic.

Ansari's most famous work is "Munajat Namah" (literally 'Litanies or dialogues with God'), which is considered a masterpiece of Persian literature. After his death, many of his sayings recorded in his written works and transmitted by his students were included in the 10-volume Tafsir of Maybudi, "Kashf al-Asrar" (The Unveiling of Secrets). This was among the earliest complete Sufi Tafsir (exegeses) of the Quran and has been published several times.

The Hanbali jurist ibn Qayyim al-Jawziyya wrote a lengthy commentary on a treatise written by Ansari entitled Madarij al-Salikin. He expressed his love and appreciation for Ansari in this commentary with his statement, "Certainly I love the Sheikh, but I love the truth more!". Ibn Qayyim al-Jawziyya refers to Ansari with the honorific title "Sheikh al-Islam" in his work Al-Wabil al-Sayyib min al-Kalim al-Tayyab

== Works ==
=== Arabic ===
- Anwar al-Tahqeeq
- Dhamm al-Kalaam
- Manāzel al-Sā'erīn
- Kitaab al-Frooq
- Kitaab al-Arba'een
- Resala Manaqib Imam Ahmad bin Hanbal (Arabic: رسالة مناقب الإمام أحمد بن حنبل)
- Zad-ul Arefeen (Arabic: زاد االعارفین)

=== Persian ===
- Munajat Namah (Persian: مناجات نامه)
- Nasayeh (Persian: نصایح)
- Kanz-ul Salikeen (Persian: کنز السالکین)
- Haft Hesar (Persian: هفت حصار)
- Elahi Namah (Persian: الهی نامه)
- Muhabbat Namah (Persian: محبت نامه)
- Qalandar Namah (Persian: قلندر نامه)
- Resala-é Del o Jan (Persian: رساله دل و جان)
- Resala-é Waredat (Persian: رساله واردات)
- Sad Maidan (Persian: صد میدان)

== Criticism ==
Like many followers of the Hanbali school, he was accused of anthropomorphism and corporealism by rationalist theologians and jurists, such as the Shafi'i-Ash'ari scholar Taj al-Din al-Subki (d. 771/1370) who mentioned in his book Tabaqat al-Shafi'iyya al-Kubra that Abu Isma'il al-Harawi was given falsely the honorary title of 'Shaykh al-Islam' by the anthropomorphists and the corporealists (al-Mujassima).

== See also ==
- Firangi Mahal
- Abu al-Abbas al-Nahawandi
- Ansaris of Saharanpur
- Ansari (Panipat)
- Abu Ayyub al-Ansari
- Hakim Ahmad Shuja
- Muhammad Latif Ansari
- Ansaris of Yusufpur
