= Sayyid Zayn al-Abidin Junabadi =

Sayyid Zayn al-Abidin Junabadi was an Iranian bureaucrat, active in the diwan under the Timurid rulers Timur (r. 1370–1405) and Shah Rukh (r. 1405–1447). A member of the provincial elite, he was a landlord in his native town of Junabad in Quhistan. He died in 1425/6; he was survived by his son Imad al-Din Mahmud Junabadi, who also served in the diwan.

== Sources ==
- Manz, Beatrice Forbes (2007). Power, Politics and Religion in Timurid Iran. Cambridge University Press. ISBN 978-1-139-46284-6.
- Manz, Beatrice Forbes (2020). "Iranian Elites under the Timurids". In Steenbergen, Jo Van (ed.). Trajectories of State Formation across Fifteenth-Century Islamic West-Asia. Brill. pp. 257–282. ISBN 978-9004431300.
- Ando, Shiro (2002). "Gonābādi, ʿEmād-al-Din Moḥammad". Encyclopædia Iranica, Vol. XI, online edition, Fasc. 2. New York. p. 122.
