= Kamal al-Din Gazurgahi =

15th and 16th-century Iranian author

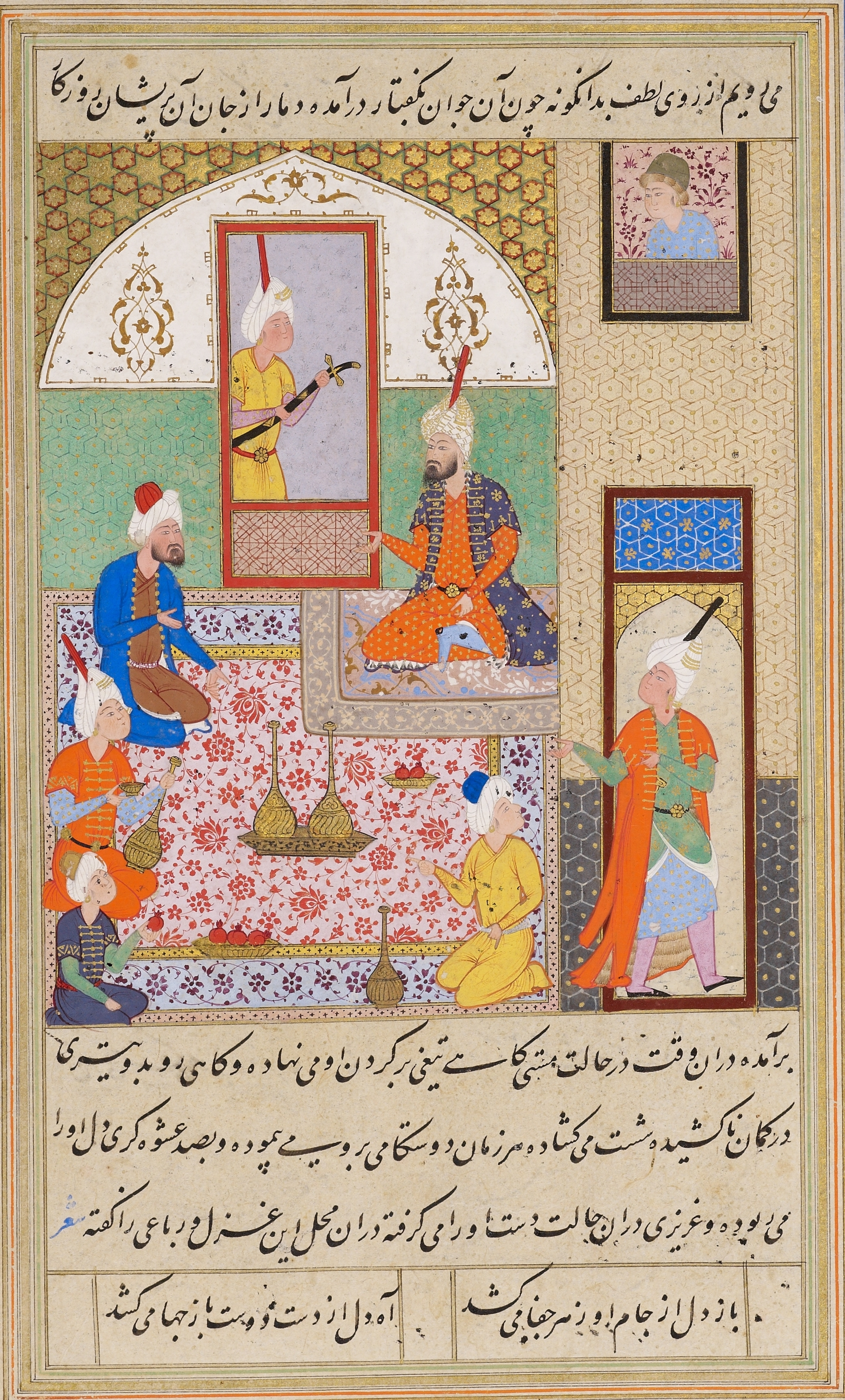
Kamal al-Din Gazurgahi in the presence of Sultan Husayn Bayqara. Folio from the Majalis al-ushshaq of Gazurgahi, dated October/November 1552

Kamal al-Din Gazurgahi (also spelled Gazorgahi; Persian: کمال الدین گازورگاهی) was an Iranian author and religious dignitary of the late 15th and early 16th centuries. He is principally known for his Majalis al-ushshaq, a Persian biographical dictionary of over 70 poets, Sufis, and members of the Turkic ruling elites.

Born in 1469/70, Gazurgahi was the nephew of Sayyid Zayn al-Abidin Junabadi, a landowner from Junabad, who served in the diwan of the Timurid Empire. In 1499, Gazurgahi was appointed as the sadr of the Timurid realm. In 1502/3, he completed his Majalis al-ushshaq.

== Sources ==
- Ando, Shiro (2000). "Gāzorgāhī, Mīr Kamāl-al-Dīn Ḥosayn". In Yarshater, Ehsan (ed.). Encyclopædia Iranica. Vol. X/4: Gāvbāzī–Geography IV. London and New York: Routledge & Kegan Paul. p. 390. ISBN 978-0-933273-49-8.
- Manz, Beatrice Forbes (2020). "Iranian Elites under the Timurids". In Steenbergen, Jo Van (ed.). Trajectories of State Formation across Fifteenth-Century Islamic West-Asia. Brill. pp. 257–282. ISBN 978-9004431300.
- Lingwood, Chad (2013). Politics, Poetry, and Sufism in Medieval Iran: New Perspectives on Jāmī's Salāmān va Absāl. Brill. ISBN 978-9004254046.
- Melville, Charles (2017). "Sultans and Lovers: Gazorgahi's Tales of Royal Infatuation". Journal of the British Institute of Persian Studies: 11–23.
