= Muhammad's views on Christians =

Muhammad's views on Christians were shaped through his interactions with them. He criticised them for some of their beliefs. He sent various letters to Christian world leaders inviting them to "Submission to God" (Islam). According to Islamic tradition, he interacted with Christians while in Mecca, although interactions were limited due to the small local Christian population and the nature of the early, private phase of his mission in Mecca.

== Book of Peace ==
The Ashtiname (Book of Peace) of Muhammad is a document which is a charter or writ ratified by Muhammad granting protection and other privileges to the followers of Jesus, given to the Christian monks of Saint Catherine's Monastery. It is sealed with an imprint representing Muhammad's hand. According to the monks' tradition, Muhammad frequented the monastery and had great relationships and discussions with the Sinai fathers.

An abridged version of the ashtiname is as follows:

This is a letter which was issued by Muhammad, son of Abdullah, the Messenger, the Prophet, the Faithful, who is sent to all the people as a trust on the part of God to all His creatures, that they may have no plea against God hereafter. Verily God is Omnipotent, the Wise. This letter is directed to the embracers of Islam, as a covenant given to the followers of Jesus the Nazarene in the East and West, the far and near, the Arabs and foreigners, the known and the unknown.

This letter contains the oath given unto them, and he who disobeys that which is therein will be considered a disbeliever and a transgressor to that whereunto he is commanded.

Whenever Christian monks, devotees and pilgrims gather together, whether in a mountain or valley, or den, or frequented place, or plain, or church, or in houses of worship, verily we are at the back of them and shall protect them, and their properties and their morals, by Myself, by My Friends and by My Assistants, for they are of My Subjects and under My Protection.

I shall exempt them from that which may disturb them; of the burdens which are paid by others as an oath of allegiance. Their judges should not be changed or prevented from accomplishing their offices, nor the monks disturbed in exercising their religious order, or the people of seclusion be stopped from dwelling in their cells.

No one is allowed to plunder these Christians, or destroy or spoil any of their churches, or houses of worship, or take any of the things contained within these houses and bring it to the houses of Islam. And he who takes away anything therefrom, will be one who has corrupted the oath of God, and, in truth, disobeyed His Messenger.

They shall not be imposed upon by anyone to undertake a journey, or to be forced to go to wars or to carry arms; for the Muslims have to fight for them. Do no dispute or argue with them, but deal according to the verse recorded in the Quran, to wit: ‘Do not dispute or argue with the People of the Book but in that which is best’ [29:46]. Thus they will live favored and protected from everything which may offend them by the Callers to religion (Islam), wherever they may be and in any place they may dwell.

Should any Christian woman be married to a Muslim, such marriage must not take place except after her consent, and she must not be prevented from going to her church for prayer. Their churches must be honored and they must not be withheld from building churches or repairing convents.

They must not be forced to carry arms or stones; but the Muslims must protect them and defend them against others. It is positively incumbent upon every one of the follower of Islam not to contradict or disobey this oath until the Day of Resurrection and the end of the world.

— The Ashtiname of Muhammad

== Before the First Revelations ==
At the age of nine, or according to some sources twelve, Muhammad went to Syria with his uncle Abu Talib and had interactions with Christians. One important contact was with the Nestorian monk Bahira in Bosra, modern Syria who foretold to the adolescent Muhammad his future prophetic career. This narrative is found in multiple accounts of Syrian literature, although, its authenticity is questioned.

Another narrative found in the Sira of Ibn Sa'd shows that while Muhammad was working for Khadija, she had him go on a journey to Syria along with a man named Maysarah. Once they reached Bostra in the south of Syria, Muhammad was reported to have taken shelter underneath a tree. A monk named Nestor approached Maysarah asking him who was the man underneath the tree. Explaining to the monk who he was, Nestor quickly responded, "None other than a Prophet is sitting beneath that tree."

Waraqah ibn Nawfal was a Nestorian monk, first cousin to Muhammad's wife Khadija, and Mecca's priest or preacher according to some sources. He was the first man to tell Muhammad that he was a prophet based on the first revelation he received in the cave of Hira.

== Byzantines ==
According to traditional Islamic sources, in 628 Muhammad sent a letter to Heraclius inviting him to Islam. The text of the letter to Heraclius (Arabic: هِرَقْل, romanized: Hiraql), reads as follows:

In the name of God, the Gracious One, the Merciful
From Muhammad, servant of God and His apostle to Heraclius, premier of the Romans:
Peace unto whoever follows the guided path!
Thereafter, verily I call you to the call of Submission [to God] ("Islam"). Submit (i.e., embrace Islam) and be safe [from perdition. And submit as] God shall compensate your reward two-folds. But if you turn away, then upon you will be the guilt [of delusion] of the peasantry.
Then "O People of the Scripture, come to a term equitable between us and you that we worship none but God and associate [as partners in worship] with Him nothing, and we take not one another as Lords apart from God. [Then God says] But if they turn away, then say: Bear witness that we are Submitters [to God] ("Muslims")."^{[Quran 3:64]}
Seal: Muhammad, Apostle of God

Islamic sources say that after the letter was read to him, he was impressed by it and he gifted the messenger of the epistle with robes and coinage. Alternatively, he also put it on his lap. Later reportedly he wrote to a certain religious official in Rome to confirm if Muhammad's claim of prophethood was legitimate, and, after receiving the reply to his letter, called the Roman assembly saying, "If you desire salvation and the orthodox way so that your empire remain firmly established, then follow this prophet," to the rejection of the council. Heraclius eventually decided against conversion but the envoy was returned to Medina with the felicitations of the emperor. Some historians disagree with this account, arguing that there is no evidence outside of Islamic sources suggesting that Heraclius had any knowledge of Islam.

In 629 according to tradition, Muhammad sent a force of 3,000 men to fight 100,000 Byzantines near Al Karak. The Battle of Mu'tah ended with a defeat of Muhammad's army. Subsequent sources present the battle as a Muslim victory given that most of the Muslim soldiers returned safely.

== Ethiopians ==
According to the traditional view, members of the early Muslim community in Mecca faced persecution, which prompted Muhammad to advise them to seek refuge in Aksum. The earliest account is given by the 8th-century historian Ibn Ishaq:

When the apostle saw the affliction of his companions, [...] he said to them: "If you were to go to Abyssinia (it would be better for you), for the king will not tolerate injustice and it is a friendly country, until such time as Allah shall relieve you from your distress." Thereupon his companions went to Abyssinia, being afraid of apostasy and fleeing to God with their religion. This was the first hijra in Islam.

When the Quraysh learned that Muhammad's companions could safely practice their religion in the Aksumite kingdom, they decided to send a delegation to the Negus to demand the surrender of the fugitives. The delegation included Amr ibn Hishām. The Meccans appealed to the generals, arguing that the Muslim migrants were "foolish youths" who had invented a new religion, the likes of which neither the Meccans nor the Aksumites had heard of, and that their relatives were asking for their return. Najashi, the king, granted them an audience and asked if they had with them anything which had come from God. One of the Muslims, Jafar, then recited a passage from the Quran's Surah Maryam (lit. 'Chapter of Mary'). When the king heard it, he exclaimed: "Verily, this and what Jesus brought (the Gospel) has come from the same source of light". He then affirmed that he would never give up the Muslims. Muhammad later wrote a letter to the Christian king an-Najjāshī (Armah) who saved the Muslims:

In the name of God, the Gracious One, the Merciful
From Muhammad, Apostle of God to an-Najjāšī, premier of the Abyssinians:
Peace unto whoever follows the guided path!
Thereafter, verily to you I make praise of God, but Whom there is no god, the King, the Holy One, the [Maker of] Peace, the Giver of Faith, the Giver of Security. And I bear witness that Jesus son of Mary is the Spirit of God and His Word that He cast into the Virgin Mary, the immaculate [and] the immune, and she was impregnated with Jesus by His Spirit and His blow like how He created Adam with His Hand. And I verily call you to the one God with no partner [associated in worship] to Him, and adherence upon His obedience, and that you follow me and believe in that which came to me, [for] I, in fact, am the Apostle of God and verily call you and your hosts toward God, [Possessor of] Might and Majesty.
And thus I have informed and sincerely admonished. So accept my sincere admonition. "And Peace unto whoever follows the guided path."^{[Quran 20:47]}
Seal: Muhammad, Apostle of God

There are no secular sources that indicate his response to the letter, but Muslim sources assume he became a Muslim since sources indicate that the Islamic prophet Muhammad prayed an absentee funeral prayer in Madinah which is performed upon a dead Muslim if they die in a place with no Muslims to pray for the dead. Such prayer is only performed for dead Muslims.

== The Christians of Najran Interaction with Muhammad during the Medina Period ==
The city of ancient-Najran, which is called Ukhdud today, is located just outside present-day Najran approximately 1200 miles south of Medina. Ancient-Najran was a Christian city located at the intersection of two main caravan routes. The city was also in a particular geographical place which allowed it to boom with agriculture and industry making it an ideal center of trade. One can infer that this played a significant role in Muhammad's interest in the city. Due to this interest, the Christian identity became vulnerable to Islam first in the Meccan period with the increase of the Qu’ran availability throughout the Arabian Peninsula. However, it was not until the Medina Period that the first interactions between the Christians of Najran and Muhammad took place.

It was during Muhammad's time in Medina that he began inviting different groups to Islam. He sent two envoys specifically to Najran; one of them being the Islamic leader Khalid ibn al-Walid who would protect the people's ability to practice Christianity under Islamic government.

So in response, Najran sent a delegation of Christian scholars with the interest of investigating the Prophet's revelations. Their group was met with hospitality and security from the Prophet. The delegation and Muhammad met for two or three days, according to some sources, debating peacefully about their religions. The debates ended in an understanding that each religion would leave the other alone.

The terms of the Covenant between Muhammad and the Najrans were:

In the name of God, the Merciful, the Beneficent. This is what Muhammad, the Prophet and God’s Messenger, has written down for the people of Najran when he has the authority over all their fruits, gold, silver, crops and slaves. He has benevolently left them all that in return for 2,000 hullas every year, 1,000 to be given in the month of Rajab and 1,000 in the month of Safar. Each hulla is equal to one ounce [a measure equal to 4 dirhams]. The Najran are also required to provide accommodation and expenses for my messengers, for up to 20 days. None of my messengers shall be kept in Najran more than one month. They are also required to give, as a loan, 30 shields, 30 horses and 30 camels, in case of any disorder and treachery in Yemen. If anything is lost of the shields, horses or camels they loan to my messenger, it will remain owing by my messenger until it is given back. Najran has the protection of God and the pledges of Muhammad, the Prophet, to protect their lives, faith, land, property, those who are absent and those who are present, and their clan and allies. They need not change anything of their past customs. No right of theirs or their religion shall be altered. No bishop, monk or church guard shall be removed from his position. Whatever they have is theirs, no matter how big or small. They are not held in suspicion and they shall suffer no vengeance killing. They are not required to be mobilized and no army shall trespass on their land. If any of them requests that any right of his should be given to him, justice shall be administered among them. He who takes usury on past loans is not under my protection. No person in Najran is answerable for an injustice committed by another.

This covenant remained intact after the death of Muhammad until the second caliph, Umar, expelled the Christians of Najran due to violations of the peace. He sent them to Iraq where they were to be taken as refugees and provided settlement.

== See also ==
- Ashtiname of Muhammad
- Christianity and Islam
