= Petition for Muslim worship at Mosque–Cathedral of Córdoba =

Religious controversy

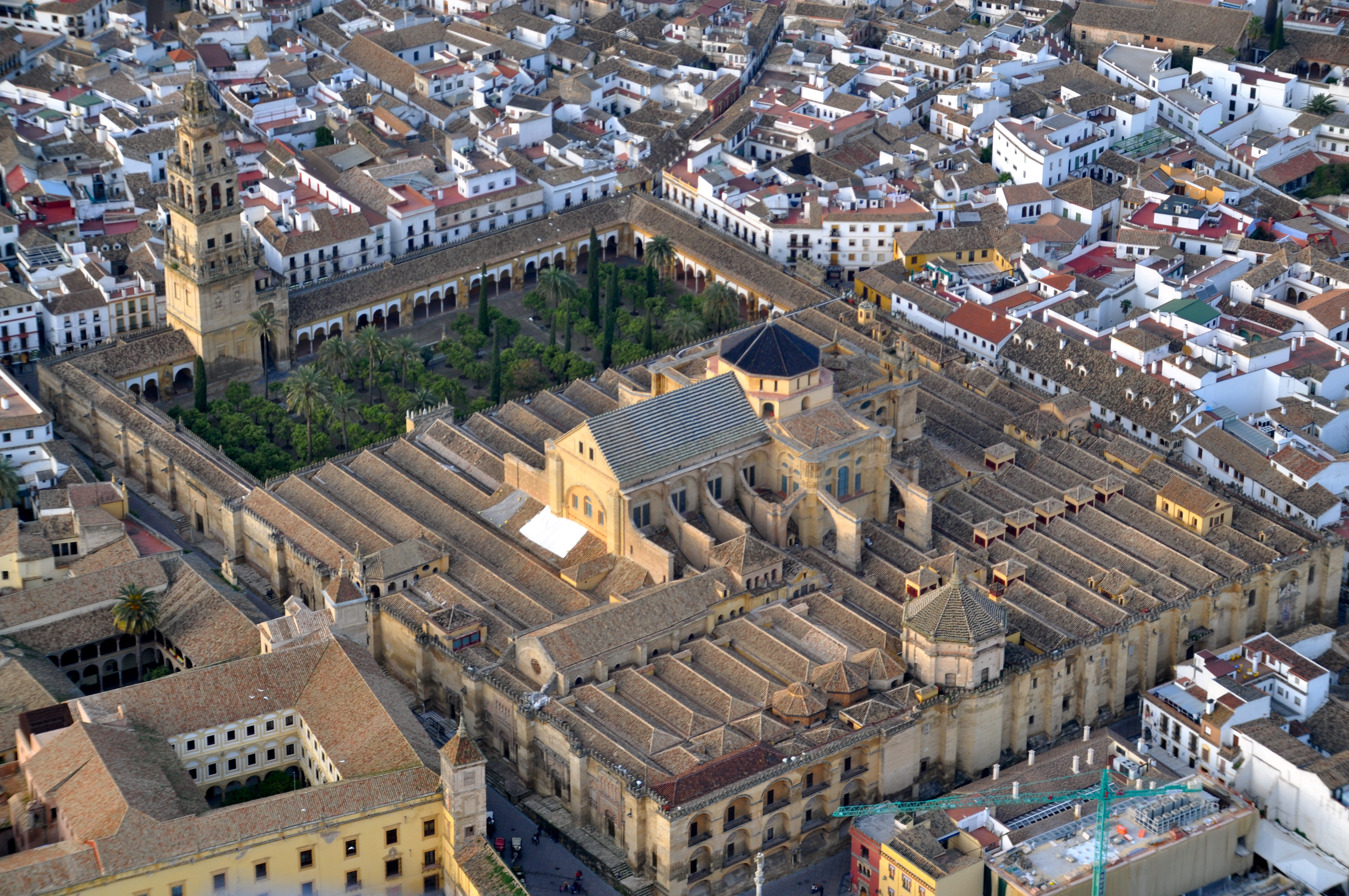
The Mosque–Cathedral of Córdoba

Since the early 2000s, Muslims in Spain have lobbied the Catholic Church to permit Muslim prayer in the Mosque–Cathedral of Córdoba. According to traditional accounts a Visigothic church, the Catholic Christian Basilica of Vincent of Saragossa, originally stood on the site of the current Mosque–Cathedral, although the historicity of this narrative has been questioned by scholars. After Córdoba came under Muslim control during the era of Al-Andalus, the current building was begun on this site in 785–786 AD to serve as the city's main mosque. In 1236, when the city was conquered by Castile during the Reconquista, the building was converted into a Catholic cathedral. It continues to serve as the city's cathedral today.

Currently, Muslim prayer is often stopped by security guards. Spanish Catholic authorities were opposed to the request as of 2012, and the Vatican has been asked to intercede but has not responded.

== Background ==
According to traditional narratives, the Christian Visigothic church of St. Vincent previously stood on the site of the current building. After the Islamic conquest of the Visigothic kingdom, the church was divided between the Muslims and Christians. In 756 the exiled Umayyad prince Abd ar-Rahman I, who escaped the Abbasid Revolution in the east, mustered allies in the Iberian Peninsula and defeated the Muslim governor, Yusuf al-Fihri, to assume power over Al-Andalus.

In 785 Abd ar-Rahman embarked on the construction of a new grand mosque for the city. According to the traditional narrative, he purchased the Christian half of St-Vincent's basilica and demolished it to make way for the new mosque. In return, he granted the Christian community the right to build or rebuild other churches. The mosque was subsequently expanded multiple times afterwards under Abd ar-Rahman's successors up to the 10th century. After its last expansion by al-Mansur (Almanzor) in the 980s, the mosque covered an area measuring 590 by 425 feet (180 m × 130 m) and became the largest mosque in the world outside of Abbasid Iraq. The mosque's architecture and its association with the height of Muslim civilization in al-Andalus made it a prestigious monument that was frequently mentioned by Muslim writers and that influenced later Islamic architecture in the region.

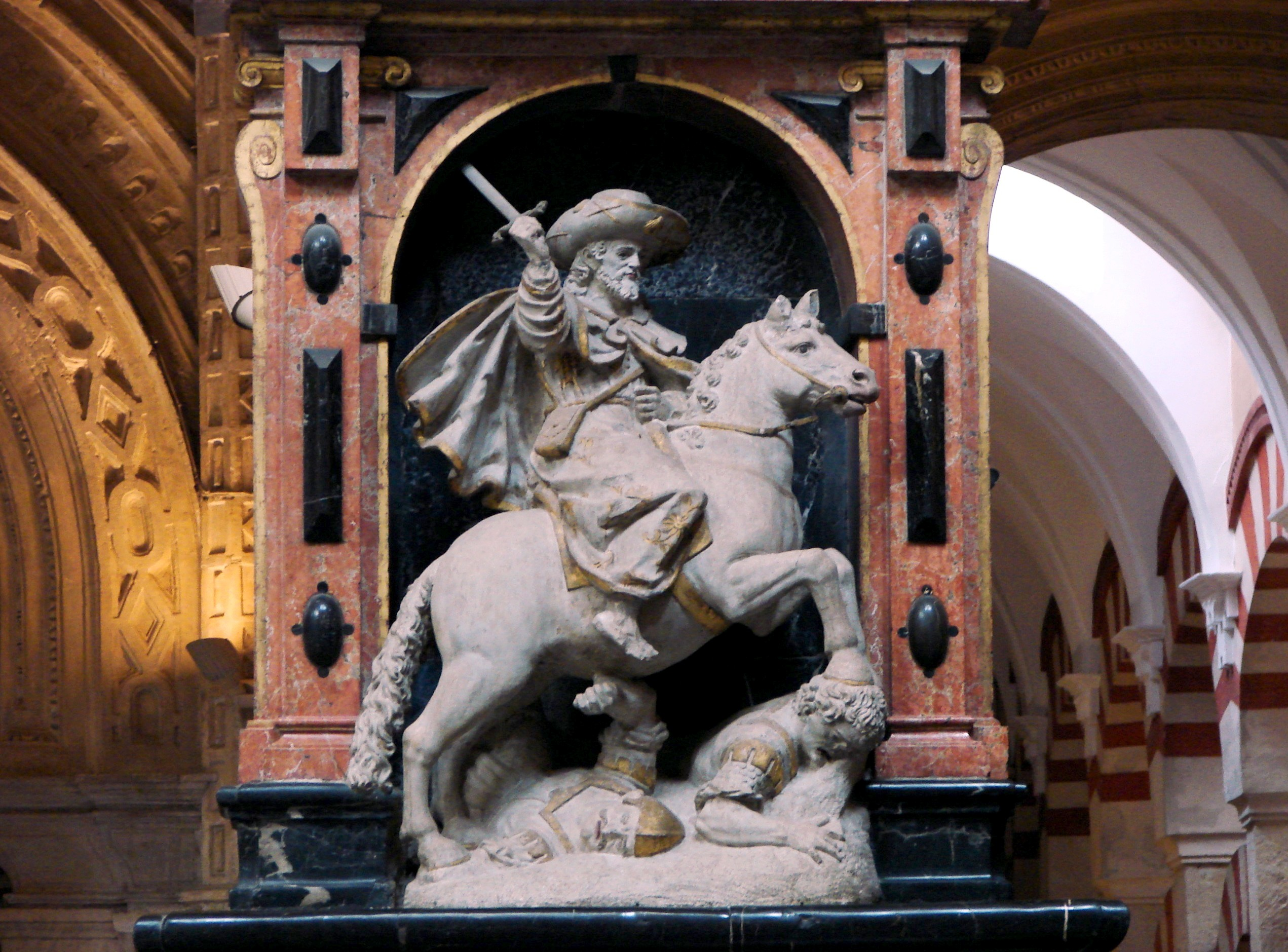
Statue of Saint James Matamoros inside the Mosque–Cathedral

In 1236, Córdoba was conquered by King Ferdinand III of Castile during the Reconquista and the mosque was converted into a cathedral dedicated to the Virgin Mary. The building remained mostly intact up until the 16th century, with relatively minor modifications and additions made to accommodate Christian services. Starting in 1523, it underwent its most significant alteration with the construction of a Renaissance-style cathedral nave, the Capilla Mayor ('Main Chapel'), in the middle of the expansive structure. The insertion was constructed by permission of Charles V, king of Castile and Aragon, against the wishes of the local city council. To commemorate the Christian conquest of the city, a statue of Saint James Matamoros, seen trampling Moors, was added near the new main altar. Artisans and architects continued to add to the existing structure until the late 18th century.

== Current Muslim campaign ==
Some Muslims across Spain are lobbying the Catholic Church to allow them to pray in the cathedral. The Islamic Council of Spain had lodged a formal request with the Vatican for Muslims to be allowed to pray in the church. Spanish church authorities oppose Muslim prayer at the cathedral.

Zakarias Maza, the director of the Taqwa mosque in neighbouring Granada stated in 2004: "We hope the Vatican will give a signal that it has a vision of openness and dialogue. It would be good if there were a gesture of tolerance on their part. The church council doesn't seem to be open to dialogue."

"In no way is this request about reclaiming our rights — far less any kind of reconquest," stated Isabel Romero, a member of the Islamic Council of Spain in 2004. "Instead, we want to give our support to the universal character of this building". Rosa Aguilar, then mayor of Córdoba for the United Left, expressed support for the Islamic Council's position.

On Christmas Day 2006, a Spanish Muslim organisation called the Spanish Islamic Board, sent a letter to the Papal nuncio to Spain, asking Pope Benedict XVI for permission for Muslims to worship alongside Christians in the building, noting that they did not intend to take control of the building or "recover a nostalgic Al-Andalus". In 2004, the Vatican's Pontifical Council for Inter-religious Dialogue had rejected a similar request from the same group. The general secretary of the Spanish Islamic Board, Mansur Escudero, said that security guards often stop Muslim worshippers from praying inside the building.

=== 2010 Muslim praying incident ===
In April 2010, two Muslim tourists were arrested at the cathedral, after an incident in which two security guards were seriously injured. The incident occurred when the building was filled with tourists visiting the cathedral during Holy Week.

According to cathedral authorities, when half a dozen Muslim citizens of Austria, who were part of a group of 118 people on an organized tour for young Muslims in Europe, knelt to pray at the same time, security guards stepped in and “invited them to continue with their tour or leave the building”. When two men refused to comply, a scuffle broke out and police were called. Two security guards were seriously injured, and the two Muslim men were detained. Spanish media, citing police sources, said that one of the men arrested had been carrying a knife.

In a statement Catholic authorities condemned the incident: “They provoked in an organized fashion a deplorable episode of violence.” After the 2010 incident, Spain's Catholic clergy reiterated that they would not be allowing any other religions to practice inside their Catholic Cathedral. Catholic authorities stated that "This one-off incident does not represent the genuine attitude of Muslims, many of whom maintain an attitude of respect and dialogue with the Catholic church".
