= May 27 =

May 27 this year in various calendars
- Wednesday, 27 May 2026
Akan	Kwawukuo
Armenian	11 Margach 1475
Aztec	Ochpaniztli 17, 8 Cōātl
Babylonian	9 Ayaru, 2337 SE
Balinese pawukon	Luang, Pepet, Beteng, Sri, Wage, Was, Buda of Warigadian, Ludra, Ogan, Pati
Bengali	13 Joishtho, BS 1433
Chinese	Yin Metal Ox・Chariot Mansion; Fire Horse Year, Month 4, Day 11 (Xiaoman, 9 days until Mangzhong)
Common Era	27 May 2026 CE
Coptic	19 Pashons, AM 1742
Egyptian	11 Phaophi, 2775 NE
Ethiopian	19 Genbot, 2018 Amätä Məhrät
French Republican	Décade I, Octidi de Prairial de l'Année 234 de la République
Gregorian	27 May, AD 2026
Hebrew	11 Sivan, AM 5786
Hindu	Hasta・Siddhi; Solar: 13 Jyeṣṭha, 1948 SE; Lunisolar: Ekādaśī, Śukla pakṣa of Adhika Jyeṣṭha, 2083 VE; Rāudra・5127 KY・1,872,722
Icelandic	Miðvikudagur, 5 Skerpla 2026
Islamic	10 Dhu al-Hijjah, AH 1447 (using tabular method)
ISO week date	2026-W22-3
Japanese	11 Uzuki, Reiwa 8 (Shōman, 10 days until Bōshu)
Julian	14 May, AD 2026 (AM 7534)
Julian day	2461188
Korean	11 Baemdal, 4359 DE
Maya	13.0.13.11.5; 18 Zip, 8 Chicchan
Roman	Pridie Idus Maias, MMDCCLXXIX AUC
Solar Hijri	6 Khordad, SH 1405
Tibetan	11 sa ga, me pho rta 2153 or 1772 or 1000

<<	May					>>
Su	Mo	Tu	We	Th	Fr	Sa
					1	2
3	4	5	6	7	8	9
10	11	12	13	14	15	16
17	18	19	20	21	22	23
24	25	26	27	28	29	30
31
2026

May 27 in recent years
2026 (Wednesday)
2025 (Tuesday)
2024 (Monday)
2023 (Saturday)
2022 (Friday)
2021 (Thursday)
2020 (Wednesday)
2019 (Monday)
2018 (Sunday)
2017 (Saturday)

May 27 is the 147th day of the year (148th in leap years) in the Gregorian calendar; 218 days remain until the end of the year.

== Events ==
=== Pre-1600 ===
- 1096 – Count Emicho enters Mainz, where his followers massacre Jewish citizens. At least 600 Jews are killed.
- 1120 – Richard III of Capua is anointed as Prince two weeks before his untimely death.
- 1153 – Malcolm IV becomes King of Scotland.
- 1199 – John is crowned King of England.
- 1257 – Richard of Cornwall, and his wife, Sanchia of Provence, are crowned King and Queen of the Germans at Aachen Cathedral.
- 1595 – A Gaelic Irish army successfully ambushes an English force in the battle of Clontibret during the Nine Years' War.

=== 1601–1900 ===
- 1644 – Manchu regent Dorgon defeats rebel leader Li Zicheng of the Shun dynasty at the Battle of Shanhai Pass, allowing the Manchus to enter and conquer the capital city of Beijing.
- 1703 – Tsar Peter the Great founds the city of Saint Petersburg.
- 1798 – The Pitt–Tierney duel takes place on Putney Heath outside London. A bloodless duel between the prime minister of Great Britain William Pitt the Younger and his political opponent George Tierney.
- 1798 – The Battle of Oulart Hill takes place in Wexford, Ireland; Irish rebel leaders defeat and kill a detachment of militia.
- 1799 – War of the Second Coalition: Austrian forces defeat the French at Winterthur, Switzerland.
- 1813 – War of 1812: In Canada, American forces capture Fort George.
- 1832 – An Egyptian army under Ibrahim Pasha captures Acre from the Ottomans after a five-months siege.
- 1860 – Giuseppe Garibaldi begins the Siege of Palermo, part of the wars of Italian unification.
- 1863 – American Civil War: The first Union infantry assault of the Siege of Port Hudson occurs.
- 1874 – The first group of Dorsland trekkers under the leadership of Gert Alberts leaves Pretoria.
- 1883 – Alexander III is crowned Tsar of Russia.
- 1896 – The F4-strength St. Louis–East St. Louis tornado hits in St. Louis, Missouri, and East St. Louis, Illinois, killing at least 255 people and causing over $10 million in damage.

=== 1901–present ===
- 1905 – Russo-Japanese War: The Battle of Tsushima begins.
- 1915 – HMS Princess Irene explodes and sinks off Sheerness, Kent, with the loss of 352 lives.
- 1917 – Pope Benedict XV promulgates the 1917 Code of Canon Law, the first comprehensive codification of Catholic canon law in the legal history of the Catholic Church.
- 1919 – The NC-4 aircraft arrives in Lisbon after completing the first transatlantic flight.
- 1927 – The Ford Motor Company ceases manufacture of the Ford Model T and begins to retool plants to make the Ford Model A.
- 1930 – The 1,046 feet (319 m) Chrysler Building in New York City, the tallest man-made structure at the time, opens to the public.
- 1933 – New Deal: The U.S. Federal Securities Act is signed into law requiring the registration of securities with the Federal Trade Commission.
- 1935 – New Deal: The Supreme Court of the United States declares the National Industrial Recovery Act to be unconstitutional in A.L.A. Schechter Poultry Corp. v. United States, (295 U.S. 495).
- 1937 – In California, the Golden Gate Bridge opens to pedestrian traffic, creating a vital link between San Francisco and Marin County, California.
- 1940 – World War II: In the Le Paradis massacre, 99 soldiers from a Royal Norfolk Regiment unit are shot after surrendering to German troops; two survive.
- 1941 – World War II: U.S. president Franklin D. Roosevelt proclaims an "unlimited national emergency".
- 1941 – World War II: The German battleship Bismarck is sunk in the North Atlantic, killing almost 2,100 men.
- 1942 – World War II: In Operation Anthropoid, Reinhard Heydrich is fatally wounded in Prague; he dies of his injuries eight days later.
- 1950 – The Linnanmäki amusement park is opened for the first time in Helsinki.
- 1958 – First flight of the McDonnell Douglas F-4 Phantom II.
- 1960 – In Turkey, a military coup removes President Celâl Bayar and the rest of the democratic government from office.
- 1962 – The Centralia mine fire is ignited in the town's landfill above a coal mine.
- 1965 – Vietnam War: American warships begin the first bombardment of National Liberation Front targets within South Vietnam.
- 1967 – Australians vote in favor of a constitutional referendum granting the Australian government the power to make laws to benefit Indigenous Australians and to count them in the national census.
- 1967 – The U.S. Navy aircraft carrier USS John F. Kennedy is launched by Jacqueline Kennedy and her daughter Caroline.
- 1971 – The Dahlerau train disaster, the worst railway accident in West Germany, kills 46 people and injures 25 near Wuppertal.
- 1971 – Pakistani forces massacre over 200 civilians, mostly Bengali Hindus, in the Bagbati massacre.
- 1975 – Dibbles Bridge coach crash near Grassington, in North Yorkshire, England, kills 33, the highest ever death toll in a road accident in the United Kingdom.
- 1977 – A plane crash at José Martí International Airport in Havana, Cuba, kills 67.
- 1980 – The Gwangju Massacre: Airborne and army troops of South Korea retake the city of Gwangju from civil militias, killing at least 207 and possibly many more.
- 1984 – The Danube–Black Sea Canal is opened, in a ceremony attended by the Ceaușescus. It had been under construction since the 1950s.
- 1988 – Somaliland War of Independence: The Somali National Movement launches a major offensive against Somali government forces in Hargeisa and Burao, then the second- and third-largest cities of Somalia.
- 1996 – First Chechen War: Russian president Boris Yeltsin meets with Chechen rebels for the first time and negotiates a cease-fire.
- 1997 – The 1997 Central Texas tornado outbreak occurs, spawning multiple tornadoes in Central Texas, including the F5 that killed 27 in Jarrell.
- 1998 – Oklahoma City bombing: Michael Fortier is sentenced to 12 years in prison and fined $200,000 for failing to warn authorities about the terrorist plot.
- 1999 – Space Shuttle Discovery is launched on STS-96, the first shuttle mission to dock with the International Space Station.
- 2001 – Members of Abu Sayyaf, an Islamist separatist group, seize twenty hostages from an affluent island resort on Palawan in the Philippines; the hostage crisis would not be resolved until June 2002.
- 2006 – The 6.4 M_{w} Yogyakarta earthquake shakes central Java with an MSK intensity of VIII (Damaging), leaving more than 5,700 dead and 37,000 injured.
- 2014 – The football club Kerala Blasters FC and its first supporters' group Manjappada are formed.
- 2016 – Barack Obama is the first president of the United States to visit Hiroshima Peace Memorial Park and meet Hibakusha.
- 2017 – Andrew Scheer takes over after Rona Ambrose as the leader of the Conservative Party of Canada.
- 2018 – Maryland Flood Event: A flood occurs throughout the Patapsco Valley, causing one death, destroying the entire first floors of buildings on Main Street in Ellicott City, and causing cars to overturn.

== Births ==
=== Pre-1600 ===
- 742 – Emperor Dezong of Tang (died 805)
- 1332 – Ibn Khaldun, Tunisian historian and theologian (died 1406)
- 1378 – Zhu Quan, Chinese military commander, historian and playwright (died 1448)
- 1519 – Girolamo Mei, Italian historian and theorist (died 1594)
- 1537 – Louis IV, Landgrave of Hesse-Marburg (died 1604)
- 1576 – Caspar Schoppe, German author and scholar (died 1649)
- 1584 – Michael Altenburg, German theologian and composer (died 1640)

=== 1601–1900 ===
- 1601 – Antoine Daniel, French-Canadian missionary and saint (died 1648)
- 1626 – William II, Prince of Orange (died 1650)
- 1651 – Louis Antoine de Noailles, French cardinal (died 1729)
- 1652 – Elizabeth Charlotte, Princess Palatine of Germany (died 1722)
- 1738 – Nathaniel Gorham, American merchant and politician, 14th President of the Continental Congress (died 1796)
- 1756 – Maximilian I Joseph of Bavaria (died 1825)
- 1774 – Francis Beaufort, Irish hydrographer and officer in the Royal Navy (died 1857)
- 1794 – Cornelius Vanderbilt, American businessman and philanthropist (died 1877)
- 1812 – George K. Teulon, English-Texian journalist and freemason (died 1846)
- 1814 – John Rudolph Niernsee, Viennese-born American architect (died 1885)
- 1815 – Henry Parkes, English-Australian politician, 7th Premier of New South Wales (died 1896)
- 1818 – Amelia Bloomer, American journalist and activist (died 1894)
- 1819 – Julia Ward Howe, American poet and songwriter (died 1910)
- 1827 – Samuel F. Miller, American lawyer and politician (died 1892)
- 1832 – Zenas Ferry Moody, American surveyor and politician, 7th Governor of Oregon (died 1917)
- 1836 – Jay Gould, American businessman and financier (died 1892)
- 1837 – Wild Bill Hickok, American police officer (died 1876)
- 1852 – Billy Barnes, English cricketer (died 1899)
- 1857 – Theodor Curtius, German chemist (died 1928)
- 1860 – Manuel Teixeira Gomes, Portuguese politician, 7th President of Portugal (died 1941)
- 1860 – Margrethe Munthe, Norwegian songwriter (died 1931)
- 1863 – Arthur Mold, English cricketer (died 1921)
- 1867 – Arnold Bennett, English author and playwright (died 1931)
- 1868 – Aleksa Šantić, Bosnian poet and author (died 1924)
- 1871 – Georges Rouault, French painter and illustrator (died 1958)
- 1875 – Frederick Cuming, English cricketer (died 1942)
- 1875 – Jorge Newbery, Argentine aviator (died 1914)
- 1876 – Ferdynand Antoni Ossendowski, Polish journalist and author (died 1945)
- 1876 – William Stanier, English engineer (died 1965)
- 1878 – Anna Cervin, Swedish artist (died 1972)
- 1879 – Karl Bühler, German-American linguist and psychologist (died 1963)
- 1879 – Hans Lammers, German judge and politician (died 1962)
- 1883 – Jessie Arms Botke, American painter (died 1971)
- 1884 – Max Brod, Czech journalist, author, and composer (died 1968)
- 1887 – Frank Woolley, English cricketer (died 1978)
- 1888 – Louis Durey, French composer (died 1979)
- 1891 – Claude Champagne, Canadian violinist, pianist, and composer (died 1965)
- 1891 – Jaan Kärner, Estonian poet and author (died 1958)
- 1894 – Louis-Ferdinand Céline, French physician and author (died 1961)
- 1894 – Dashiell Hammett, American detective novelist and screenwriter (died 1961)
- 1895 – Douglas Lloyd Campbell, Canadian educator and politician, 13th Premier of Manitoba (died 1995)
- 1897 – John Cockcroft, English physicist and academic, Nobel Prize laureate (died 1967)
- 1897 – Dink Templeton, American rugby player and coach (died 1962)
- 1898 – David Crosthwait, American engineer, inventor and writer (died 1976)
- 1899 – Johannes Türn, Estonian chess and draughts player (died 1993)
- 1900 – Lotte Toberentz, German overseer of the Nazi Uckermark concentration camp (died 1964)
- 1900 – Uładzimir Žyłka, Belarusian poet and translator (died 1933)

=== 1901–present ===
- 1906 – Buddhadasa, Thai monk and philosopher (died 1993)
- 1906 – Harry Hibbs, English footballer (died 1984)
- 1906 – Antonio Rosario Mennonna, Italian bishop (died 2009)
- 1907 – Nicolas Calas, Greek-American poet and critic (died 1988)
- 1907 – Rachel Carson, American biologist, environmentalist, and author (died 1964)
- 1909 – Dolores Hope, American singer and philanthropist (died 2011)
- 1909 – Juan Vicente Pérez, Venezuelan supercentenarian, oldest living man, last man born in 1900s decade (died 2024)
- 1911 – Hubert Humphrey, American journalist and politician, 38th Vice President of the United States (died 1978)
- 1911 – Teddy Kollek, Hungarian-Israeli politician, Mayor of Jerusalem (died 2007)
- 1911 – Vincent Price, American actor (died 1993)
- 1912 – John Cheever, American novelist and short story writer (died 1982)
- 1912 – Sam Snead, American golfer and sportscaster (died 2002)
- 1912 – Terry Moore, American baseball player, coach, and manager (died 1995)
- 1915 – Ester Soré, Chilean singer-songwriter (died 1996)
- 1915 – Herman Wouk, American novelist (died 2019)
- 1917 – Harry Webster, English engineer (died 2007)
- 1918 – Yasuhiro Nakasone, Japanese commander and politician, 45th Prime Minister of Japan (died 2019)
- 1921 – Bob Godfrey, Australian-English animator, director, and voice actor (died 2013)
- 1922 – Otto Carius, German lieutenant and pharmacist (died 2015)
- 1922 – Christopher Lee, English actor (died 2015)
- 1922 – John D. Vanderhoof, American banker and politician, 37th Governor of Colorado (died 2013)
- 1923 – Henry Kissinger, German-American political scientist and politician, 56th United States Secretary of State, Nobel Prize laureate (died 2023)
- 1923 – Sumner Redstone, American businessman and philanthropist (died 2020)
- 1924 – Jaime Lusinchi, Venezuelan physician and politician, President of Venezuela (died 2014)
- 1924 – John Sumner, English-Australian director, founded the Melbourne Theatre Company (died 2013)
- 1925 – Tony Hillerman, American journalist and author (died 2008)
- 1927 – Jüri Randviir, Estonian chess player and journalist (died 1996)
- 1928 – Thea Musgrave, Scottish-American composer and educator
- 1930 – John Barth, American novelist and short story writer (died 2024)
- 1930 – William S. Sessions, American civil servant and judge, 8th Director of the Federal Bureau of Investigation (died 2020)
- 1930 – Eino Tamberg, Estonian composer and educator (died 2010)
- 1931 – André Barbeau, French-Canadian neurologist (died 1986)
- 1931 – John Chapple, English field marshal and politician, Governor of Gibraltar (died 2022)
- 1931 – Bernard Fresson, French actor (died 2002)
- 1931 – Faten Hamama, Egyptian actress and producer (died 2015)
- 1931 – Philip Kotler, American author and professor
- 1933 – Edward Samuel Rogers, Canadian businessman (died 2008)
- 1933 – Manfred Sommer, Spanish author and illustrator (died 2007)
- 1934 – Ray Daviault, Canadian-American baseball player (died 2020)
- 1934 – Harlan Ellison, American author and screenwriter (died 2018)
- 1935 – Daniel Colchico, American football player and coach (died 2014)
- 1935 – Mal Evans, British road manager of the Beatles (died 1976)
- 1935 – Jerry Kindall, American baseball player and coach (died 2017)
- 1935 – Ramsey Lewis, American jazz pianist and composer (died 2022)
- 1935 – Lee Meriwether, American model and actress, Miss America 1955
- 1936 – Benjamin Bathurst, English admiral (died 2025)
- 1936 – Louis Gossett Jr., American actor and producer (died 2024)
- 1936 – Marcel Masse, Canadian educator and politician, 29th Canadian Minister of National Defence (died 2014)
- 1937 – Allan Carr, American playwright and producer (died 1999)
- 1939 – Simon Cairns, 6th Earl Cairns, English courtier and businessman
- 1939 – Yves Duhaime, Canadian captain and politician
- 1939 – Sokratis Kokkalis, Greek businessman
- 1939 – Gerald Ronson, English businessman and philanthropist
- 1939 – Lionel Sosa, Mexican-American advertising and marketing executive
- 1939 – Don Williams, American singer-songwriter and guitarist (died 2017)
- 1940 – Mike Gibson, Australian journalist and sportscaster (died 2015)
- 1942 – Lee Baca, American police officer
- 1942 – Piers Courage, English racing driver (died 1970)
- 1942 – Roger Freeman, Baron Freeman, English accountant and politician, Chancellor of the Duchy of Lancaster
- 1942 – Robin Widdows, English racing driver
- 1943 – Cilla Black, English singer and actress (died 2015)
- 1943 – Bruce Weitz, American actor
- 1944 – Christopher Dodd, American lawyer and politician
- 1944 – Karen Fladset, Norwegian handball player
- 1944 – Ingrid Roscoe, English historian and politician, Lord Lieutenant of West Yorkshire (died 2020)
- 1944 – Alain Souchon, French singer-songwriter, guitarist, and actor
- 1945 – Bruce Cockburn, Canadian singer-songwriter and guitarist
- 1946 – Niels-Henning Ørsted Pedersen, Danish bassist and composer (died 2005)
- 1946 – John Williams, English motorcycle racer (died 1978)
- 1947 – Peter DeFazio, American politician
- 1947 – Marty Kristian, German-Australian singer-songwriter, guitarist, and actor
- 1947 – Branko Oblak, Slovenian footballer and coach
- 1947 – Riivo Sinijärv, Estonian politician, 19th Estonian Minister of Foreign Affairs
- 1948 – Wubbo de Boer, Dutch civil servant (died 2017)
- 1948 – Pete Sears, English bass player
- 1948 – Morning Glory Zell-Ravenheart, American occultist and author (died 2014)
- 1949 – Hugh Lowther, 8th Earl of Lonsdale, English politician (died 2021)
- 1949 – Christa Vahlensieck, German runner
- 1950 – Dee Dee Bridgewater, American singer-songwriter and actress
- 1950 – Makis Dendrinos, Greek basketball player and coach (died 2015)
- 1951 – John Conteh, English boxer
- 1954 – Pauline Hanson, Australian businesswoman, activist, and politician
- 1954 – Jackie Slater, American football player and coach
- 1955 – Eric Bischoff, American wrestler, manager, and producer
- 1955 – Richard Schiff, American actor, director, and producer
- 1955 – Ian Tracey, English organist and conductor
- 1956 – Cynthia McFadden, American journalist
- 1956 – Rosemary Squire, English producer and manager, co-founded Ambassador Theatre Group
- 1956 – Giuseppe Tornatore, Italian director and screenwriter
- 1957 – Dag Terje Andersen, Norwegian politician, Norwegian Minister of Labour
- 1957 – Nitin Gadkari, Indian lawyer and politician, Indian Minister of Transport
- 1957 – Eddie Harsch, Canadian-American keyboard player and bass player (died 2016)
- 1957 – Siouxsie Sioux, English singer-songwriter, musician, and producer
- 1958 – Nick Anstee, English accountant and politician, 682nd Lord Mayor of London
- 1958 – Neil Finn, New Zealand singer-songwriter and musician
- 1958 – Jesse Robredo, Filipino politician, 23rd Secretary of the Interior and Local Government (died 2012)
- 1960 – Gaston Therrien, Canadian ice hockey player and sportscaster
- 1961 – José Luíz Barbosa, Brazilian runner and coach
- 1961 – Peri Gilpin, American actress
- 1962 – Marcelino Bernal, Mexican footballer
- 1962 – Ray Borner, Australian basketball player
- 1962 – Steven Brill, American actor, director, producer, and screenwriter
- 1962 – Anthony A. Hyman, Israeli-English biologist and academic
- 1962 – David Mundell, Scottish lawyer and politician, Secretary of State for Scotland
- 1962 – Ravi Shastri, Indian cricketer, coach and sportscaster
- 1963 – Gonzalo Rubalcaba, Cuban pianist and composer
- 1963 – Maria Walliser, Swiss skier
- 1964 – Adam Carolla, American actor, producer, and screenwriter
- 1965 – Todd Bridges, American actor
- 1965 – Pat Cash, Australian-English tennis player and sportscaster
- 1966 – Heston Blumenthal, English chef and author
- 1967 – Paul Gascoigne, English international footballer, coach, and manager
- 1967 – Eddie McClintock, American actor
- 1968 – Jeff Bagwell, American baseball player and coach
- 1968 – Rebekah Brooks, English journalist
- 1968 – Harun Erdenay, Turkish basketball player and coach
- 1968 – Frank Thomas, American baseball player and sportscaster
- 1969 – Todd Hundley, American baseball player
- 1969 – Jeremy Mayfield, American race car driver
- 1969 – Craig Federighi, American computer scientist and engineer
- 1970 – Michele Bartoli, Italian cyclist
- 1970 – Tim Farron, English educator and politician
- 1970 – Joseph Fiennes, English actor
- 1970 – Alex Archer, American-born Australian musician
- 1971 – Mathew Batsiua, Nauruan politician
- 1971 – Paul Bettany, English actor
- 1971 – Wayne Carey, Australian footballer and coach
- 1971 – Kaur Kender, Estonian author
- 1971 – Lisa Lopes, American rapper and dancer (died 2002)
- 1971 – Lee Sharpe, English footballer
- 1971 – Grant Stafford, South African tennis player
- 1971 – Sophie Walker, British politician, leader of the Women's Equality Party
- 1971 – Petroc Trelawny, British radio and television broadcaster
- 1972 – Todd Demsey, American golfer
- 1972 – Antonio Freeman, American football player
- 1972 – Maxim Sokolov, Russian ice hockey player
- 1973 – Jack McBrayer, American actor and comedian
- 1973 – Tana Umaga, New Zealand rugby player and coach
- 1974 – Skye Edwards, British singer-songwriter
- 1974 – Denise van Outen, English actress, singer, and television host
- 1974 – Derek Webb, American singer-songwriter and guitarist
- 1974 – Danny Wuerffel, American football player
- 1975 – André 3000, American rapper
- 1975 – Michael Hussey, Australian cricketer
- 1975 – Jadakiss, American rapper
- 1975 – Jamie Oliver, English chef and author
- 1975 – Feryal Özel, Turkish astrophysicist, astronomer, and academic
- 1976 – Marcel Fässler, Swiss racing driver
- 1977 – Abderrahmane Hammad, Algerian high jumper
- 1977 – Mahela Jayawardene, Sri Lankan cricketer
- 1978 – Adin Brown, American soccer player
- 1979 – Michael Buonauro, American author and illustrator (died 2004)
- 1979 – Mile Sterjovski, Australian footballer
- 1980 – Craig Buntin, Canadian figure skater
- 1981 – Alina Cojocaru, Romanian ballerina
- 1981 – Johan Elmander, Swedish footballer
- 1982 – Natalya, Canadian professional wrestler
- 1982 – Mariano Pavone, Argentine footballer
- 1983 – Clare Rustad, Canadian soccer player
- 1984 – Blake Ahearn, American basketball player
- 1984 – Miguel González, Mexican baseball pitcher
- 1985 – Chiang Chien-ming, Taiwanese baseball player
- 1985 – Roberto Soldado, Spanish footballer
- 1986 – Conor Cummins, Manx motorcycle racer
- 1986 – Bamba Fall, Senegalese basketball player
- 1986 – Lasse Schöne, Danish footballer
- 1987 – Gervinho, Ivorian footballer
- 1987 – Bella Heathcote, Australian actress
- 1987 – Bora Paçun, Turkish basketball player
- 1987 – Matt Prior, Australian rugby league player
- 1987 – Martina Sáblíková, Czech speed skater and cyclist
- 1988 – Celso Borges, Costa Rican footballer
- 1988 – Vontae Davis, American football player (died 2024)
- 1988 – Irina Davydova, Russian hurdler
- 1988 – Garrett Richards, American baseball pitcher
- 1988 – Tyler Sash, American football player (died 2015)
- 1989 – Igor Morozov, Estonian footballer
- 1989 – Peakboy, South Korean rapper, record producer, and singer-songwriter
- 1990 – Yenew Alamirew, Ethiopian runner
- 1990 – Chris Colfer, American actor and singer
- 1990 – Jonas Hector, German footballer
- 1990 – Marcus Kruger, Swedish ice hockey player
- 1991 – Sebastien Dewaest, Belgian footballer
- 1991 – Tim Lafai, Samoan rugby league player
- 1991 – Ksenia Pervak, Russian tennis player
- 1991 – Mário Rui, Portuguese footballer
- 1991 – Armando Sadiku, Albanian footballer
- 1991 – Eneli Vals, Estonian footballer
- 1992 – Aaron Brown, Canadian sprinter
- 1992 – Jeison Murillo, Colombian footballer
- 1992 – Laurence Vincent-Lapointe, Canadian canoer
- 1994 – Maximilian Arnold, German footballer
- 1994 – João Cancelo, Portuguese footballer
- 1994 – Aymeric Laporte, French-Spanish footballer
- 1994 – Aleksandra Uznańska-Wiśniewska, Polish–Thai politician, political scientist, and humanitarian
- 1995 – Yoán Moncada, Cuban baseball player
- 1996 – Kim Jae-hwan, South Korean singer
- 1997 – Anna Bondar, Hungarian tennis player
- 1997 – Daniel Jones, American football player
- 1997 – Konrad Laimer, Austrian footballer
- 1998 – Josep Martínez, Spanish footballer
- 1999 – Matheus Cunha, Brazilian footballer
- 1999 – Lily-Rose Depp, French-American actress and model
- 2000 – Abner Vinícius, Brazilian footballer
- 2002 – Jérémy Doku, Belgian footballer
- 2002 – Gabri Veiga, Spanish footballer
- 2003 – Franco Colapinto, Argentine racing driver

== Deaths ==
=== Pre-1600 ===
- 366 – Procopius, Roman usurper (born 325)
- 398 – Murong Bao, emperor of the Xianbei state Later Yan (born 355)
- 475 – Eutropius, bishop of Orange
- 866 – Ordoño I of Asturias (born 831)
- 927 – Simeon I of Bulgaria first Bulgarian Emperor (born 864)
- 1039 – Dirk III, Count of Holland (born 981)
- 1045 – Bruno of Würzburg, imperial chancellor of Italy (born c. 1005)
- 1178 – Godfrey van Rhenen, bishop of Utrecht
- 1240 – William de Warenne, 5th Earl of Surrey (born 1166)
- 1444 – John Beaufort, 1st Duke of Somerset, English commander (born 1404)
- 1508 – Ludovico Sforza, Duke of Milan (born 1452)
- 1525 – Thomas Müntzer, German mystic and theologian (born 1488)
- 1541 – Margaret Pole, Countess of Salisbury (born 1473)
- 1564 – John Calvin, French pastor and theologian (born 1509)

=== 1601–1900 ===
- 1610 – François Ravaillac, French assassin of Henry IV of France (born 1578)
- 1624 – Diego Ramírez de Arellano, Spanish sailor and cosmographer (born c. 1580)
- 1637 – John Boteler, 1st Baron Boteler of Brantfield, English politician (born c. 1566)
- 1661 – Archibald Campbell, 1st Marquess of Argyll, Scottish general and politician (born 1607)
- 1675 – Gaspard Dughet, Italian-French painter (born 1613)
- 1690 – Giovanni Legrenzi, Italian organist and composer (born 1626)
- 1702 – Dominique Bouhours, French priest and critic (born 1628)
- 1707 – Françoise-Athénaïs, marquise de Montespan, French mistress of Louis XIV of France (born 1640)
- 1781 – Giovanni Battista Beccaria, Italian physicist and academic (born 1716)
- 1797 – François-Noël Babeuf, French journalist (born 1760)
- 1831 – Jedediah Smith, American hunter, explorer, and author (born 1799)
- 1840 – Niccolò Paganini, Italian violinist and composer (born 1782)
- 1867 – Thomas Bulfinch American mythologist (born 1796)
- 1896 – Aleksandr Stoletov, Russian physicist, engineer, and academic (born 1839)

=== 1901–present ===
- 1910 – Robert Koch, German physician and microbiologist, Nobel Prize laureate (born 1843)
- 1918 – Ōzutsu Man'emon, Japanese sumo wrestler, the 18th Yokozuna (born 1869)
- 1919 – Kandukuri Veeresalingam, Indian author and activist (born 1848)
- 1933 – Achille Paroche, French target shooter (born 1868)
- 1939 – Joseph Roth, Austrian-French journalist and author (born 1894)
- 1941 – Ernst Lindemann, German captain (born 1894)
- 1941 – Günther Lütjens, German admiral (born 1889)
- 1942 – Muhammed Hamdi Yazır, Turkish theologian, logician, and translator (born 1878)
- 1943 – Gordon Coates, New Zealand soldier and politician, 21st Prime Minister of New Zealand (born 1878)
- 1945 – Enno Lolling, German physician (born 1888)
- 1947 – Ed Konetchy, American baseball player and manager (born 1885)
- 1949 – Robert Ripley, American cartoonist, publisher, and businessman, founded Ripley's Believe It or Not! (born 1890)
- 1953 – Jesse Burkett, American baseball player and manager (born 1868)
- 1960 – James Montgomery Flagg, American painter and illustrator (born 1877)
- 1963 – Grigoris Lambrakis, Greek physician and politician (born 1912)
- 1964 – Jawaharlal Nehru, Indian lawyer and politician, 1st Prime Minister of India (born 1889)
- 1965 – John Rinehart Blue, American military officer, educator, businessperson, and politician (born 1905)
- 1967 – W. Otto Miessner, American composer and educator (born 1880)
- 1967 – Ernst Niekisch, German academic and politician (born 1889)
- 1969 – Jeffrey Hunter, American actor and producer (born 1926)
- 1971 – Béla Juhos, Hungarian-Austrian philosopher from the Vienna Circle (born 1901)
- 1971 – Armando Picchi, Italian footballer and coach (born 1935)
- 1980 – Gün Sazak, Turkish agronomist and politician (born 1932)
- 1984 – Vasilije Mokranjac, Serbian composer (born 1923)
- 1986 – Murder of the Faruqis:
  - Ismail al-Faruqi, Palestinian-American Muslim philosopher and scholar (born 1921)
  - Lois Lamya al-Faruqi, American scholar of ethnomusicology, wife of Ismail al-Faruqi (born 1926)
- 1986 – Ajoy Mukherjee, Indian politician, Chief Minister of West Bengal (born 1901)
- 1986 – Giorgos Tzifos, Greek actor and cinematographer (born 1918)
- 1987 – John Howard Northrop, American biochemist and academic, Nobel Prize laureate (born 1891)
- 1988 – Hjördis Petterson, Swedish actress (born 1908)
- 1988 – Ernst Ruska, German physicist and academic, Nobel Prize laureate (born 1906)
- 1989 – Arseny Tarkovsky, Russian poet and translator (born 1907)
- 1990 – Robert B. Meyner, American lawyer and politician, 44th Governor of New Jersey (born 1908)
- 1991 – Leopold Nowak, Austrian musicologist and theorist (born 1904)
- 1992 – Uncle Charlie Osborne, American fiddler (born 1890)
- 1998 – Minoo Masani, Indian lawyer and politician (born 1905)
- 2000 – Kazimierz Leski, Polish engineer and pilot (born 1912)
- 2000 – Murray MacLehose, Baron MacLehose of Beoch, Scottish politician and diplomat, 25th Governor of Hong Kong (born 1917)
- 2000 – Maurice Richard, Canadian ice hockey player and coach (born 1921)
- 2002 – Marjorie Ogilvie Anderson, Scottish historian (born 1909)
- 2003 – Luciano Berio, Italian composer and educator (born 1925)
- 2006 – Rob Borsellino, American journalist (born 1949)
- 2006 – Paul Gleason, American actor (born 1939)
- 2006 – Craig Heyward, American football player (born 1966)
- 2007 – Izumi Sakai, Japanese singer-songwriter (born 1967)
- 2007 – Gretchen Wyler, American actress and dancer (born 1932)
- 2007 – Ed Yost, American inventor, created the modern hot air balloon (born 1919)
- 2008 – Franz Künstler, Hungarian soldier (born 1900)
- 2009 – Thomas M. Franck, American lawyer and academic (born 1931)
- 2009 – Clive Granger, Welsh-American economist and academic, Nobel Prize laureate (born 1934)
- 2009 – Mona Grey, British nursing administrator; Northern Ireland's first Chief Nursing Officer (born 1910)
- 2009 – Abram Hoffer, Canadian biochemist, physician, and psychiatrist (born 1917)
- 2009 – Gérard Jean-Juste, Haitian-American priest and theologian (born 1946)
- 2009 – Carol Anne O'Marie, American nun and author (born 1933)
- 2009 – William Refshauge, Australian soldier and physician (born 1913)
- 2009 – Paul Sharratt, English-American television host (born 1933)
- 2010 – Payut Ngaokrachang, Thai animator and director (born 1929)
- 2011 – Jeff Conaway, American actor and singer (born 1950)
- 2011 – Margo Dydek, Polish-American basketball player (born 1974)
- 2011 – Gil Scott-Heron, American singer-songwriter and poet (born 1949)
- 2012 – Simeon Daniel, Nevisian educator and politician, 1st Premier of Nevis (born 1934)
- 2012 – Friedrich Hirzebruch, German mathematician and academic (born 1927)
- 2012 – Anahit Perikhanian, Russian-born Armenian Iranologist (born 1928)
- 2012 – David Rimoin, Canadian-American geneticist and academic (born 1936)
- 2013 – Jagjit Singh Lyallpuri, Indian politician (born 1917)
- 2013 – Bill Pertwee, English actor (born 1926)
- 2013 – Abdoulaye Sékou Sow, Malian politician, Prime Minister of Mali (born 1931)
- 2014 – Robert Genn, Canadian painter and author (born 1936)
- 2014 – Helma Sanders-Brahms, German director, producer, and screenwriter (born 1940)
- 2014 – Roberto Vargas, Puerto Rican-American baseball player, coach, and manager (born 1929)
- 2014 – Massimo Vignelli, Italian-American graphic designer (born 1931)
- 2015 – Erik Carlsson, Swedish rally driver (born 1929)
- 2015 – Nils Christie, Norwegian sociologist, criminologist, and author (born 1928)
- 2015 – Andy King, English footballer and manager (born 1956)
- 2015 – Michael Martin, American philosopher and academic (born 1932)
- 2017 – Gregg Allman, American musician, singer and songwriter (born 1947)
- 2018 – Gardner Dozois, American science fiction author and editor (born 1947)
- 2020 – Larry Kramer, American playwright, public health advocate and LGBT rights activist (born 1935)
- 2021 – Poul Schlüter, former Prime Minister of Denmark (born 1929)
- 2024 – Elizabeth MacRae, American actress (born 1936)
- 2024 – Bill Walton, American basketball player and sportscaster (born 1952)
- 2025 – Freddie Aguilar, Filipino musician and singer-songwriter (born 1953)

== Holidays and observances ==
- Armed Forces Day (Nicaragua)
- Children's Day (Nigeria)
- Christian feast day:
  - Augustine of Canterbury
  - Blessed Lojze Grozde
  - Bruno of Würzburg
  - Eutropius of Orange
  - Hildebert
  - Julius the Veteran
  - May 27 (Eastern Orthodox liturgics)
- Mother's Day (Bolivia)
- Navy Day (Japan)
- Slavery Abolition Day (Guadeloupe, Saint Barthélemy, Saint Martin)
- Start of National Reconciliation Week (Australia)
