= 475 =

475 in various calendars
- Gregorian calendar: 475; CDLXXV
- Ab urbe condita: 1228
- Assyrian calendar: 5225
- Balinese saka calendar: 396–397
- Bengali calendar: −119 – −118
- Berber calendar: 1425
- Buddhist calendar: 1019
- Burmese calendar: −163
- Byzantine calendar: 5983–5984
- Chinese calendar: 甲寅年 (Wood Tiger); 3172 or 2965 — to — 乙卯年 (Wood Rabbit); 3173 or 2966
- Coptic calendar: 191–192
- Discordian calendar: 1641
- Ethiopian calendar: 467–468
- Hebrew calendar: 4235–4236
- Hindu calendars
- Vikram Samvat: 531–532
- Shaka Samvat: 396–397
- Kali Yuga: 3575–3576
- Holocene calendar: 10475
- Iranian calendar: 147 BP – 146 BP
- Islamic calendar: 152 BH – 151 BH
- Javanese calendar: 360–361
- Julian calendar: 475; CDLXXV
- Korean calendar: 2808
- Minguo calendar: 1437 before ROC 民前1437年
- Nanakshahi calendar: −993
- Seleucid era: 786/787 AG
- Thai solar calendar: 1017–1018
- Tibetan calendar: ཤིང་ཕོ་སྟག་ལོ་ (male Wood-Tiger); 601 or 220 or −552 — to — ཤིང་མོ་ཡོས་ལོ་ (female Wood-Hare); 602 or 221 or −551

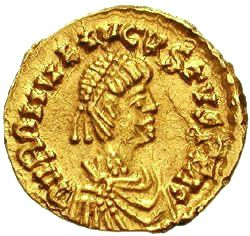
Emperor Romulus Augustus

Year 475 (CDLXXV) was a common year starting on Wednesday of the Julian calendar. At the time, it was known as the Year of the Consulship of Zeno without colleague (or, less frequently, year 1228 Ab urbe condita). The denomination 475 for this year has been used since the early medieval period, when the Anno Domini calendar era became the prevalent method in Europe for naming years.

== Events ==
=== By place ===
==== Roman Empire ====
- Spring - Spanish War of Euric: The comes Hispaniarum Vincentius capitulates against the Aquitanian Goths; Euric completes his conquest of Spain.
- January 9 – Emperor Zeno abdicates under pressure, as his wife's uncle Basiliscus stages a coup d'état at Constantinople, with support from Zeno's trusted adviser and fellow Isaurian Illus. Basiliscus usurps the throne and is proclaimed new emperor (Augustus) of the Eastern Roman Empire. He begins a 20-month reign; Zeno and his supporters flee to Isauria.
- April 9 – Basiliscus issues a circular letter (Enkyklikon) to the bishops of his empire, promoting the Miaphysite christological position. These religious views will make him highly unpopular.
- Summer – Emperor Julius Nepos grants the Visigoth King Euric legal tenure of his conquests, which include Provence (region of Gaul), in exchange for full independence.
- August 28 – Magister Militum Orestes takes control of the government in Ravenna, and forces Julius Nepos to flee to Dalmatia.
- October 31 – Romulus Augustus is installed as emperor by his father Orestes, who becomes regent in effect of the Western Roman Empire. Augustus will ultimately rule for 10 months, as the last Western Emperor.

==== Asia ====
- Bodhidharma, Buddhist monk, travels to China and, begins teaching the Laṅkāvatāra Sūtra (approximate date).
- Gongju becomes the capital of Baekje, and is threatened by Goguryeo, who conquers the Han River valley (Korea).
- Munju becomes king of Baekje.

==== Byzantine Empire ====
- Great fire in Constantinople with loss of Palace of Lausus and - along with it - the famous Zeus from Olympia.

=== By topic ===
==== Art ====
- A Bodhisattva (detail of a wall painting in the Ajanta Caves) in Maharashtra (India) of the Gupta period) is made (approximate date).

==== Religion ====
- The compilation of the Babylonian Talmud, the source of the majority of Jewish Halakha, is completed.
- The Church of Saint Simeon Stylites is consecrated in Syria.

== Births ==
- Íte of Killeedy, Irish nun (approximate date)
- Ferreolus of Rodez, Roman senator (approximate date)

== Deaths ==
- May 27 – Eutropius, bishop of Orange
- Flavius Magnus, Roman consul
- Gaero, king of Baekje (Korea)
- Mamertus, bishop of Vienne
- Theodemir, king of the Ostrogoths (approximate date)
- Tonantius Ferreolus, praetorian prefect
- Vincentius, comes Hispaniarum
