= Murder of the Faruqis =

1986 murders of Islamic scholars in the U.S.

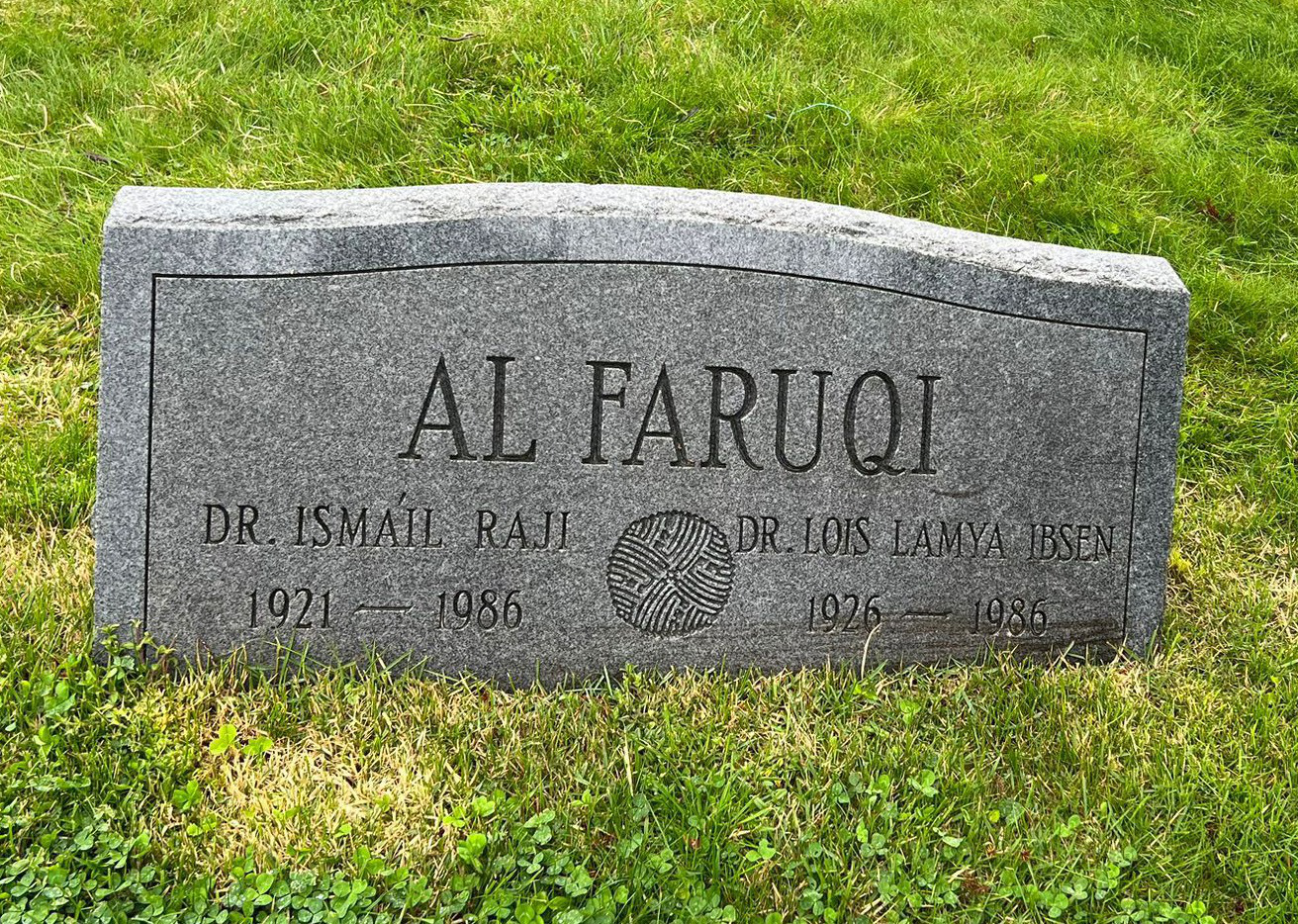
- Shared grave of the Faruqis
- Location: 40.0876364°N 75.1443599°W; Wyncote, Pennsylvania, United States
- Date: May 27, 1986; 40 years ago Around 2:00 AM (EST)
- Attack type: Double homicide
- Weapon: Survival knife
- Injuries: 1 (Anmar el-Zein)
- Victims: Ismail al-Faruqi (aged 65); Lois Lamya al-Faruqi (aged 59)
- Perpetrator: Joseph Louis Young (Yusuf Ali)
- Motive: Potential political motivations, personal vendetta, or robbery gone wrong
- Charges: Murder
- Verdict: Guilty
- Convictions: Joseph Louis Young sentenced to death (died in prison of natural causes before execution)

The murder of the Faruqis occurred on May 27, 1986, at their home in Wyncote, Pennsylvania, United States. Isma'il Raji al-Faruqi, a prominent Islamic scholar, and his wife, Lois Lamya al-Faruqi (née Lois Rachel Ibsen), a respected art historian known for her contributions to ethnomusicology, were killed in an attack that drew widespread attention due to their academic standing and the nature of the crime. Their daughter, Anmar el-Zein, who was eight months pregnant at the time, survived multiple stab wounds and managed to alert authorities despite severe injuries requiring 200 stitches. She described the assailant as a stocky man wearing a black scarf tied in a "cowboy-robber" style.

Due to al-Faruqi's prominence, the Cheltenham Township Police Department investigated the case with assistance from the FBI. The incident sparked discussions about potential motives, which ranged from political retaliation due to al-Faruqi's outspoken views on the Israeli-Palestinian conflict to personal vendettas.

== Background ==
Isma'il al-Faruqi was a distinguished professor of religion at Temple University, known for his extensive work in Islamic studies and interfaith dialogue. Lois Lamya al-Faruqi was an American scholar and expert on Islamic art and music. She co-authored The Cultural Atlas of Islam with her husband, making significant contributions to understanding Islamic musical culture. Their work in promoting interfaith dialogue and understanding was significant, influencing many scholars and students in the field. James Zogby, a former student of al-Faruqi, reflected on the professor's passion for intellectual discourse, mentioning, "Sometimes we were up until 2 a.m. He loved the intellectual discourse. You would have to define every point to the ultimate."

== Crime and investigation ==
On the evening of May 26, 1986, Ismail al-Faruqi attended an iftar meal with the local chapter of the Muslim Students Association (MSA) and returned home at around 11:00 PM. In the early morning of May 27, 1986, al-Faruqi and his wife were found with multiple stab wounds in their home.

Al-Faruqi's body was discovered in his bedroom, while Lois Lamya al-Faruqi's body was found at the foot of the stairs. Their 27-year-old daughter, Anmar el-Zein, who was eight months pregnant, was also stabbed multiple times during the attack but managed to call the police. She required 200 stitches for wounds to her chest and arms. A 15-inch survival-type knife found near al-Faruqi's body was identified as the murder weapon. The crime scene indicated a break-in and a violent struggle.

The Cheltenham Township Police Department led the investigation, with the FBI assisting due to al-Faruqi's prominence. Anmar el-Zein described the attacker as a stocky black man with a "pot belly" wearing a black bandana. Initial theories suggested the murders might have been politically motivated due to al-Faruqi's outspoken views on the Israeli-Palestinian conflict and his association with the American-Arab Anti-Discrimination Committee. According to Hafeez Malik, a professor of political science at Villanova University and a longtime friend, al-Faruqi had talked often of threats made against his life, stating, "He had been threatened, no doubt. He told me that (his) life is constantly threatened."

== Legal proceedings ==
=== Arrest and charges ===
In January 1987, Joseph Louis Young, also known as Yusuf Ali, was identified as the primary suspect. A fingerprint match on a bloody surgical glove found at the scene led to Young's arrest. Additionally, a stolen 1986 Grey Honda Accord LX was found with bloodstains, providing forensic evidence linking the crime to Young.

Earlier, detectives in Montgomery County had received an anonymous phone call suggesting they compare the latent fingerprints found at the crime scene with those of Young. The fingerprints were matched, leading to Young's identification as a suspect.

According to a police source, Young's statement to police indicated that the slaying of al-Faruqi may have been politically or religiously motivated rather than a random act of violence. The source stated that Young believed al-Faruqi was "not doing the right thing for the Muslim religion." Young reportedly knew al-Faruqi through the Islamic community at Temple University and had been planning the murder "for some time."

Young, who had a criminal history and knew the al-Faruqi family, confessed to the crime during questioning by Philadelphia detectives, providing information that matched the evidence. He repeated his confession in the presence of Montgomery County police officers.

=== Trial ===
The trial of Joseph Louis Young began in July 1987. During the proceedings, the prosecution presented substantial evidence linking Young to the crime, including his fingerprints on a glove found at the scene and testimony from surviving witness Anmar el-Zein. This was further supported by forensic analyses matching blood and hair samples found at the crime scene to those of Young.

In a detailed confession recorded by Philadelphia homicide detective Carol Keenan, Young admitted purchasing a 15-inch survival knife at a flea market several days before the murders. He described visiting the Faruqi residence multiple times to familiarize himself with the neighborhood and plan an escape route. On the night of May 27, Young wore surgical gloves, entered the home through a partially open pantry window, and attacked the family. He claimed he intended only to confront Isma'il al-Faruqi outside but entered the house quietly to avoid detection by neighbors. Lois Lamya al-Faruqi encountered Young first and screamed, prompting him to attack her immediately. After stabbing her repeatedly, Young then assaulted Isma'il al-Faruqi and their daughter, Anmar, who survived despite severe injuries. Forensic evidence presented at trial showed that Isma'il al-Faruqi sustained 15 stab wounds, while Lois Lamya al-Faruqi suffered seven stab wounds, highlighting the brutality of the assault.

Young claimed his actions were motivated by personal delusions regarding the Faruqis, which psychiatric testimony characterized as symptoms of mental disturbance. His defense argued that Young suffered from severe mental illness, triggered by childhood trauma, and suggested that his confession had been coerced. They also raised the possibility of accomplices being involved in the crime. Prosecution psychiatrists, however, testified Young did not meet the legal criteria for insanity and was fully aware of the nature and consequences of his actions during the murders.

On 10 July 1987, the jury found Young guilty of two counts of first-degree murder for the deaths of Isma'il and Lois Lamya al-Faruqi. He was also convicted of attempted murder, burglary, criminal trespass, and aggravated assault. Following a separate sentencing hearing, the jury returned a verdict of death for each murder conviction, citing aggravating circumstances that outweighed any mitigating factors.

=== Appeals and resentencing ===
Young's initial appeal led to affirming his convictions but a remand for resentencing due to issues with the original sentencing instructions. In 1990, a resentencing hearing was held, and once again, the jury returned a death sentence for each murder conviction, confirming the existence of four aggravating circumstances.

== Funeral and burial ==
On May 30, 1986, nearly 4,000 mourners, including international dignitaries, gathered in the Masjid Muhammad mosque in West Philadelphia to honor al-Faruqi and his wife, Lois. The service included eulogies from speakers who remembered al-Faruqi as a significant figure and community member. Imam Shamsud-din Ali led prayers, recognizing their contributions to the community.

The mosque was attended by friends, associates, and community members, many in traditional attire. The service included Arabic sayings, prayers, and readings from the Qur'an. Many students and local community members were present.

Following the prayer service, the Faruqis were buried together at Forest Hills Cemetery in Lower Moreland Township, Pennsylvania.

== Aftermath ==
Young died of natural causes in prison in 1996, before the execution could be carried out.

Various theories about the murders' motivations persisted. Some speculated a politically motivated assassination due to al-Faruqi's scholarly work, while others considered a personal vendetta. Despite extensive investigation, the precise motive remained unclear.

The case received extensive media attention, highlighting the crime's brutality and the subsequent investigation and trial. The National Council of Churches' Committee on Christian-Muslim Relations "received with great sorrow the news of the shocking and tragic deaths of Drs. Isma'il and Lamya' al-Faruqi." It expressed "condolences to the Faruqi family, to their friends and co-workers and to the whole world Muslim community for whom the Faruqis provided international leadership."

At the time of his death, al-Faruqi was reviewing the final draft of The Path of Islamic Da'wah in the West, a collection of papers he had presented at the UK Islamic Mission’s annual conference in 1985. According to the editors' preface, a request for his approval was sent shortly before news of his death was received.

A year after the incident, the remaining members of the Faruqi family sold their home and moved away from the area. In 2011, the house where the murders occurred was put up for sale, drawing further media interest due to its violent history.

Al-Faruqi's intellectual contributions continue to influence Islamic studies and interfaith relations, with his works remaining a core part of discussions on Muslim identity and rights in the U.S. His advocacy for Palestinian issues and his role in groups such as the American-Arab Anti-Discrimination Committee have left a lasting impact on how Islam is engaged in academic and political discourse in America and beyond.

During a conference at the International Islamic University Malaysia in 2008, it was revealed that al-Faruqi's father had made special supplications for him to become a great scholar and to die as a martyr (shahīd), which were ultimately fulfilled.
