= Spanish War of Euric =

- Part of Fall of the Roman Empire; Gothic wars
- Situation in Spain before the war
Date	473-475
Location	Hispania Tarraconensis
Result	Gothic victory

Belligerents
Aquitaanse Goten	West Roman Empire

Commanders and leaders
Euric; Alla en Sindela	Vincentius

Casualties and losses
unknown	† Vincentius

The Spanish War of Eurik was a military conflict at the end of the West Roman Empire, in which the Gothic rex Euric expanded its power over most of Hispania (present-day Spain and Portugal).

== Background ==
Euric ruled the Aquitian Goths from 466 to 484. He was one of the most powerful kings of his time and the first Gothic monarch which formed a de facto independent kingdom, apart from Roman claims of authority. In the years before 471, Euric had already brought large parts of Gaul (present-day southern France) under his control, with Toulouse as his capital. In Hispania, Roman authority had virtually collapsed, local administrators still acted on behalf of the Empire, but there was no longer any effective military control, except for the province of Tarraconensis (the northeastern part) where Roman authority still functioned.

Around 473 Euric decided to extend his power to the Iberian Peninsula. The exact reason is not entirely clear, but presumably he saw an opportunity due to the chaos within the Western Roman Empire. Emperor Anthemius was assassinated in 472 and in Italy Ricimer ruled without an emperor until the Eastern part moved forward Nepos in 474 as emperor for the West. According to indirect indications from the chronicle of Hydatius and later summaries of Jordan, his operation had two goals: to eliminate still loyal Roman garrisons and to limit the influence of the Suebi.

== The war in Spain ==
=== Start ===
In the course of 473 Euric ordered his armies in Hispania to subdue the remaining Roman garrisons and local troops there. The province of Tarraconensis was the last major area in Hispania where Roman authority still functioned.

The sources do not mention specific battles, but the war must have been heavy and long. The Roman resistance was personally led by the comes Hispaniarum Vincentius. He offered strong defense from the cities of Tarraco and Caesaraugusta and was able to stop the Gothic advance for a while. Eventually he had to surrender and Eurik subjugated the entire province in 474 or early 475. Jordanes mentions a hundred years later, summarizing:

«"Euric 'conquered all of Spain, even those regions that opposed his rule for a long time".«

Only Gallaecia (northwest, present-day Galicia) remained outside his power, where the Suebi ruled, a Germanic people who had its own kingdom.

=== Expire ===
Isidor of Seville (560-637) tells us that Eurik had the Roman commander Vincentius murdered, with which he wanted to force the Roman aristocracy into tractability. In the course of 475, the Western Roman emperor Julius Nepos tried to stabilize the situation diplomatically. A treaty was presumably concluded in which Eurics' authority over all of Hispania and Gaul, from the Pyrenees to the Loire and the Rhône, was recognized in exchange for peace. This recognition actually meant the end of Roman power in Spain. In return, Provence returned to the control of Rome. Modern historians (such as Roger Collins and Peter Heather) interpret this as a realistic peace deal, in which Nepos acknowledged that he could no longer change anything militarily.

== Aftermath ==
This peace lasted only a short time. Already in 476–477 the Western Roman Empire finally collapsed (Romulus Augustulus deposed). Eurik took advantage of this and shortly afterwards occupied Provence, probably around 477–479. With this, the last Roman administrative region in the West disappeared outside. The Roman emperor in the East Zeno officially recognized his power over Aquitaine and Gaul around 477–479.

== Sources ==
- Sidonius Apollinaris, Epistulae
- Hydatius, Chronicon
- Jordanes, Getica
- Isodor of Sevilla, Historia Gothorum

== Bibliography ==
- Heather, Peter (1996). The Goths. Oxford and Malden, MA: Blackwell. ISBN 978-0-63116-536-1.
- Thompson, Edward Arthur (1969). The Goths in Spain. Clarendon Press. ISBN 978-0198142713.
- Collins,R. (2004), Visigothic Spain, 409–711, Oxford
