= Cheltenham Township Police Department =

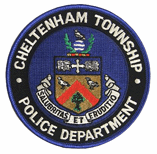
- The Patch of Cheltenham Police
- Abbreviation: CTPD
- Motto: Salubratis et Eruditio; Health and Education

Agency overview
- Formed: February 1903

Jurisdictional structure
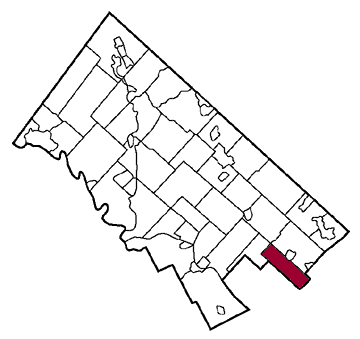
- Cheltenham Township location in Montgomery County
- Area: 9 square miles (23 km^{2})
- Population: 36,793 (2010)
- Governing body: Township of Cheltenham

Operational structure
- Headquarters: Cheltenham Township Building; 8230 Old York Road; Elkins Park, PA 19027; United States
- Police Officers: 71
- Agency executive: John Slavin, Chief of Police

Website
- Cheltenham Township Police

The Cheltenham Township Police Department is a police department that operates under the Commonwealth of Pennsylvania and Montgomery County. It patrols the 9.0 square mile township of Cheltenham, which comprises Glenside, Elkins Park, Wyncote, La Mott, Melrose Park, Laverock and Cheltenham Village. Cheltenham Police operates as the fourth largest police force in Montgomery County (behind Lower Merion, Abington, and Upper Merion), and is the third largest municipality, serving over 38,000 residents. The Township is the 28th largest in Pennsylvania by population, but has the sixth highest overall number of UCR Part One Crimes and the seventh highest per capita UCR Part One Crimes in Pennsylvania per the 2024 FBI UCR Crime Report (Table 8). The Department responded to almost 35,000 calls in 2024.

== History ==
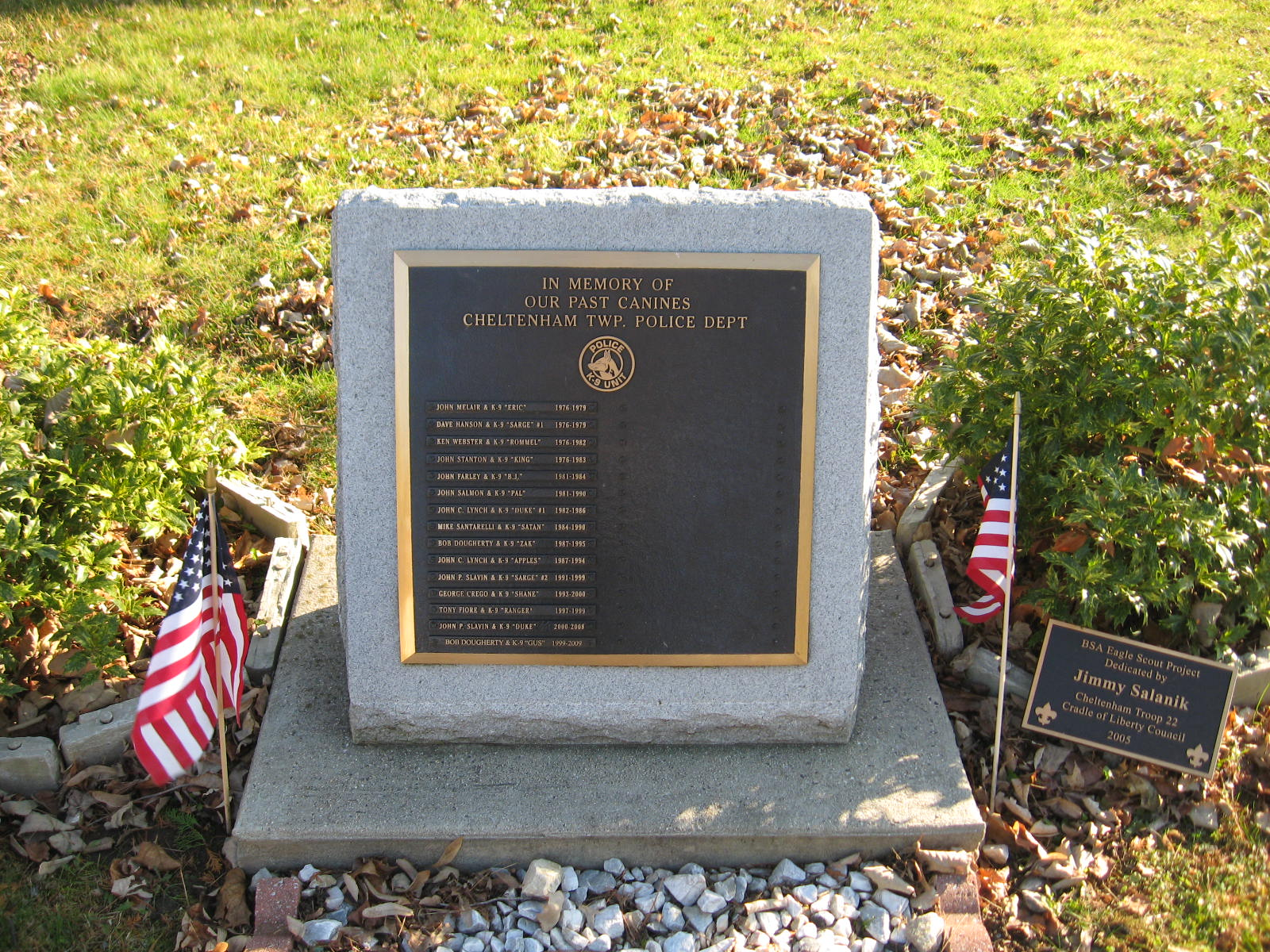
The K-9 Unit Memorial at the Township building.

Cheltenham Township Police Department was formed in February 1903 by the Township board of Commissioners. At the time of formation, there was one chief, and only seven officers. Since then, the force has expanded dramatically, operating with 86 members in the early 2000's. However, due to drastic budget cuts, the number of sworn personnel has dwindled to 76 in 2010-2011, and 70 in 2015. 2012 saw the Cheltenham Police Department's first layoffs in the Township's history, when 2 sworn members and 3 civilian employees were laid off due to Township budget shortfalls.

The Cheltenham Township Police Department started 2017 with only 67 sworn personnel, down 19 officers from the authorized force of 86 in the late 1990s into the early 2000s. However, as of 2020 the number has increased to 71 officers. Staffing was again cut in 2026, reducing the force to 69 officers.

== Divisions ==
Cheltenham Police can be divided into three divisions: The Administrative Services and Professional Standards Division, the Detective Division, and the Patrol Division. Current total authorized staffing is one Chief, three Lieutenants, thirteen Sergeants and fifty four Police Officers.

=== Administrative Services and Professional Standards Division ===
The Administrative Services Division consists of one Lieutenant, three Sergeants, three Police Officers, and several Civilian staff. The Administrative Services & Professional Standards Division is made up of Sworn Personnel and nearly all of the department's Civilian non-sworn Employees (except for the Evidence Technician and the Chief's Administrative Assistant). Administration Services & Professional Standards Division responsibilities include receiving, processing, and investigating all citizen complaints, conducting all internal investigations, and serve as the Department’s liaison on all civil actions involving the Department. All Department wide mandatory training and all specialized training for our Officers are coordinated through the Administration Services & Professional Standards Division. Additionally, the Community Response Unit falls under this division. The Township's School Crossing Guards also fall under this division.

=== Detective Division ===
The Detective Division consists of seven detectives, two Detective Sergeants, and one Detective Lieutenant Commander. The detectives work cooperatively with the police officers to solve crimes, in addition to working closely with the community. The Detectives are provided with state of the art equipment necessary to solve all cases.

=== Patrol Division ===
The Patrol Division is what comprises the majority of the police force. The Patrol Division is the first group that is notified in the case of an emergency. The Patrol Division consists of one Lieutenant, eight Street Supervisors, and forty Police Officers. Each team of two Supervisors manage one of four platoons. Nearly all of the Officers in the Patrol Division are trained in Crisis Intervention, and there are a number of Officers who are trained as Crime Scene Technicians who are capable of processing crime scenes for physical evidence.

=== Special Units ===
In addition to the divisions, the Cheltenham Police also includes several special units. The major units are:

- Animal Patrol
- Community Policing
- Drug Task Force
- Highway Safety
- K-9 Unit
- SWAT

== Auxiliary Police Unit ==
The Auxiliary Police Unit was disbanded in the late 2010's.

The Cheltenham Auxiliary Police has 30 all-volunteer members, who support the Cheltenham Police. Although not armed, the Auxiliary police members are qualified to use police communications and vehicles when necessary. Auxiliary Police members can often be seen at parades, Concerts in the Park, the Township Harvest Festival, and other community events, to make sure they all run smoothly.

== See also ==
- Murder of the Faruqis
