= Vincentius (comes) =

Vincentius, also spelled Vicentius, was a late Roman military commander who held the position of Comes Hispaniarum in Spain. As a provincial commander, Vincentius exercised both military and civil-administrative duties. The Iberian Peninsula was in a transitional phase in the second half of the 5th century. The Western Roman Empire was crumbling and was gradually being replaced by the power of the Aquitanian Goths under King Euric. Vincentius operated in Hispania Tarraconensis (northeast Spain) during this period.

== History ==
In the 470s, during the Spanish War of Euric Vincenius led the last Roman resistance from the cities of Tarraco (Tarragona) and Caesaraugusta (Zaragoza). He offered serious military resistance. The Latin writer Sidonius Apollinaris, a contemporary, explicitly calls him "virtus Romanae provinciae," which indicates bravery in battle. Historians infer from this that his troops were able to temporarily halt Euric's advance, battles are not recorded. In early 475, he cappitted, and Euric was able to completely subdue the province. According to Isidore of Seville (560-636), Vincent was then murdered by two Gothic officers, Alla and Sindila.

== Sources ==
- Chronica Gallica of 511
- PLRE
- Sidonius Apollinaris, letters
- Isidore of Seville, Historia Gothorum

== Bibliography ==
- Heather, Peter (1996). The Goths. Oxford and Malden, MA: Blackwell. ISBN 978-0-63116-536-1.
- Thompson, Edward Arthur (1969). The Goths in Spain. Clarendon Press. ISBN 978-0198142713.
