= The Cultural Atlas of Islam =

1986 book by Isma'il and Lois Lamya' al-Faruqi

- Cover of the 1986 edition
- Author: Ismail al-Faruqi and Lois Lamya al-Faruqi
- Language: English
- Subject: Islamic studies, Islamic culture, History of Islam
- Published: 1986
- Publisher: Macmillan Publishing Company
- Publication place: United States
- Media type: Print
- Pages: 512
- ISBN: 9780029101902
- OCLC: 849811134
- Preceded by: Divine Transcendence and Its Expression (1983)

The Cultural Atlas of Islam is a reference work by Palestinian-American philosopher Isma'il Raji al-Faruqi and Lois Lamya al-Faruqi, published posthumously in 1986. Combining a substantial text with maps and illustrations, it surveys Islamic history, regions, arts, and institutions across multiple periods and geographies.

== Overview ==
The book presents text and visual material on Islamic societies’ historical development, regional distribution, and cultural production. The book has been described as "a lavish, visual feast" with a substantial text.

== Background ==
The book was the final collaboration between Isma'il al-Faruqi and his wife, Lois Lamya al-Faruqi, combining his philosophical perspective with her expertise in Islamic art and music. The volume appeared in 1986 as a joint posthumous publication. The authors aimed to provide a comprehensive portrayal of Islamic culture, addressing various aspects of its historical and cultural development.

== Contents ==
The Cultural Atlas of Islam is organized into several key sections:

=== Introduction ===
The introduction provides an overview of the Islamic world, its people, and its cultural diversity.

=== Historical Background ===
This section offers a detailed chronology of Islamic history from the time of the Prophet Muhammad to the modern era.

=== Geographical Distribution ===
This part includes maps and descriptions of the regions where Islam is practised, highlighting the diversity within the Muslim world.

=== Cultural Contributions ===
In this section, the book explores Islamic art, architecture, literature, music, and science, illustrating the achievements of Muslim civilizations.

=== Social Structures ===
This part examines Islamic societies' social, economic, and political aspects, including family structures, education, and governance.

== Themes ==
The central themes focus on the unity and diversity of Islamic culture. The authors emphasize the concept of tawhid (the oneness of God) as a central theme in Islamic art and culture. Other themes include the importance of knowledge, the interconnection between different Islamic regions, and the dynamic nature of Islamic civilization over time.

== Reception and criticism ==
The book received a range of thoughtful reviews, both positive and critical. It was often praised for its ambition and visual richness, capturing the scope of Islamic civilization across time and geography. Some reviewers also saw it as a reflection of the modern Muslim intellectual revival, noting that its comparative treatment of other religions could appear assertive or polemical. Others pointed to structural and stylistic challenges, citing its dense vocabulary, uneven organisation, and limited integration between text and visual elements. Despite these reservations, the work has continued to be recognised as a major contribution to the study of Islamic culture, valued for its scope, visual documentation, and civilizational perspective.

== Publication ==
The Cultural Atlas of Islam was first published in 1986 by Macmillan Publishing Company in New York and by Collier Macmillan in London. A later printing is distributed by Islamic Book Trust in Malaysia, with identical content and format.
