= Eutropius of Orange =

Bishop of Orange, France, during the 5th century

Saint Eutropius of Orange
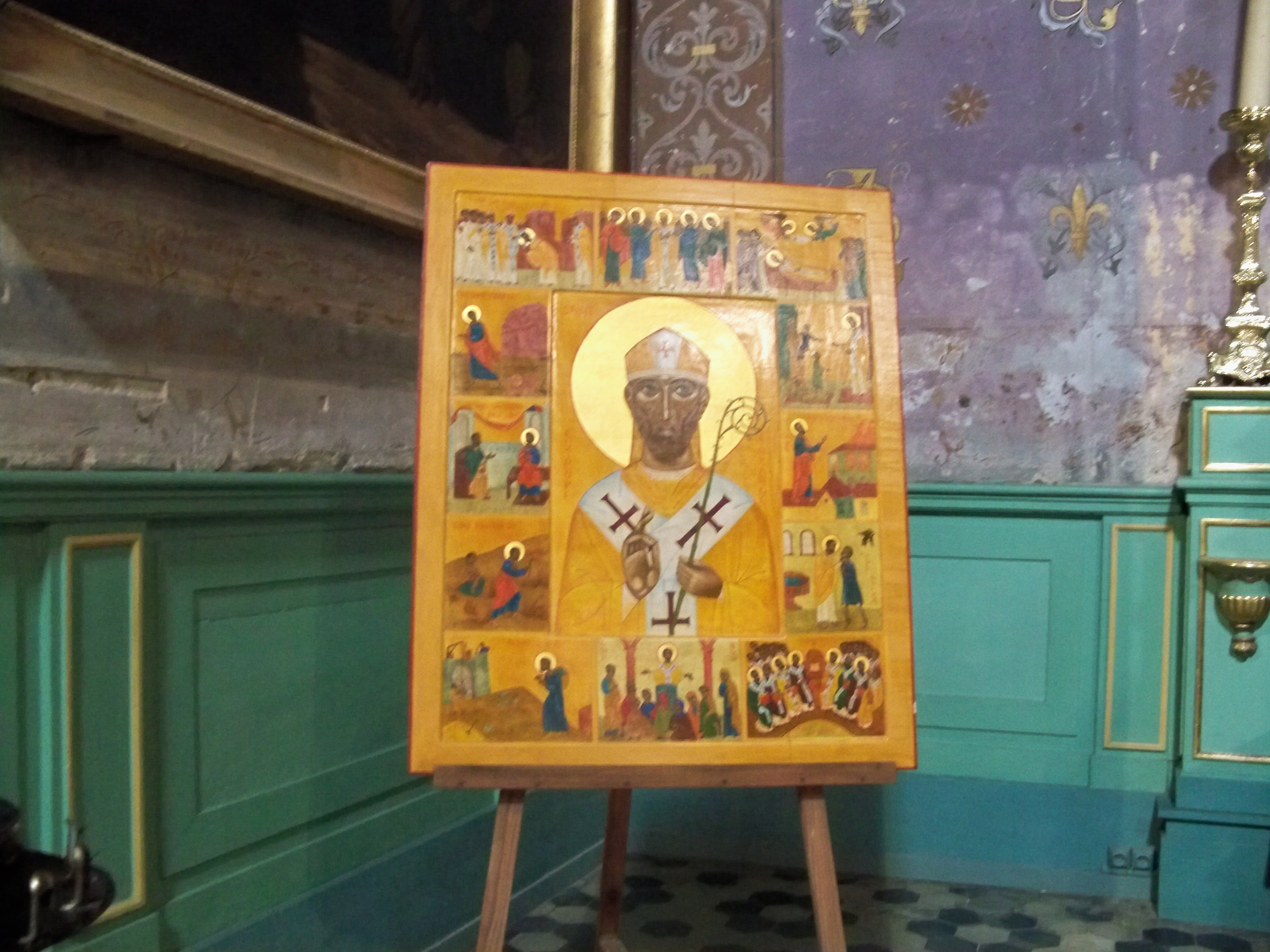
- Saint Eutropius, in Notre Dame de Nazareth Cathedral, Orange

Bishop
- Died: 27 May 475
- Venerated in: Roman Catholic Church, Eastern Orthodox Church
- Canonized: Pre-Congregation
- Major shrine: St Mary Magdalene's Chapel, London Oratory
- Feast: 27 May

Eutropius of Orange (French: Saint Eutrope; died 475) was bishop of Orange, France, during the 5th century and probably since 463, in succession to Justus.

== Life ==
Eutropius was born to the nobility, in Marseille, where he spent a wild and wasted youth. According to tradition, he was converted by his wife and after her death was ordained a deacon by Eustochius. He became Bishop of Orange, succeeding Justin. At first, he was overwhelmed by the magnitude of the work he would have to do and fled. A man of God named Aper convinced him to return and devote himself to tending his flock. He became famous, among other things, for his extreme devotion.

During his episcopate, which lasted about twelve years, he did not hesitate to devote himself to many manual tasks, sometimes in a field where he himself worked with a plough, sometimes at a building site where he carried stones even when the other workers were having their meals.

Eutropius corresponded with Pope Hilarius and was a friend of Saint Faustus of Riez. Letters from contemporaries speak highly of his learning and piety. Sidonius Apollinaris speaks of him in the highest and most reverential terms. He took part in the Council of Arles in 463 and 475. His diocese was destroyed by the Visigoths and he died on 27 May 475.

He was buried in the Basilica of St Julien d'Antioch, which he himself had built. Around the year 500, his successor Verus wrote his Life, which describes various miracles: the deliverance of a possessed person, the healing of someone struck by lightning; stopping a fire through prayer.

== Veneration ==
His relics are now interred in the altar of St Mary Magdalene's Chapel in the London Oratory. His feast day is 27 May.

The 19th century stained glass window in the apse of Notre-Dame Cathedral in Orange depicts him.
