= Lois Lamya al-Faruqi =

Islamic scholar of ethnomusicology

- Born: 25 July 1926; Plentywood, Montana, United States
- Died: 27 May 1986 (aged 59); Wyncote, Pennsylvania, United States
- Cause of death: Murder by stabbing
- Spouse: Ismail al-Faruqi (m. 1951; died 1986)
- Children: 5

Academic background
- Education: Syracuse University

Academic work
- Main interests: Islamic art, Ethnomusicology, Islamic music
- Notable ideas: Islamic perspective on music, Music and Religion
- Website: ismailfaruqi.com

Lois Lamya al-Faruqi (née Lois Rachel Ibsen, July 25, 1926 – May 27, 1986) was an American scholar and expert on Islamic art and music. She made contributions to the field of ethnomusicology, particularly in the study of Islamic musical culture, and co-authored the work The Cultural Atlas of Islam with her husband, Ismail al-Faruqi.

== Early life and education ==
Lois Lamya al-Faruqi was born in 1927 in Plentywood, Montana to Fred Ibsen and Rachel Ibsen (née Flaten), who were Danish and Norwegian immigrants, respectively. She graduated from the University of Montana in 1948 with a degree in music, where she studied piano. She then attended Indiana University, receiving an M.A. in music in 1949. During this period, she met and married Ismail Raji al-Faruqi. She taught at Butler University for three years before focusing on Islamic studies. She continued her education at McGill University and later obtained her Ph.D. in humanities from Syracuse University with a thesis entitled The Nature of the Musical Art of Islamic Culture: A Theoretical and Empirical Study of Arabian Music.

== Professional and academic contributions ==
Lois Lamya al-Faruqi held positions as an adjunct professor at Temple University and Villanova University from 1977 onwards. She was actively involved in the Society for Ethnomusicology, serving on various committees, including as president and program chairman of the Mid-Atlantic Chapter.

=== Areas of expertise ===
Lois Lamya al-Faruqi focused on Islamic musical culture. Her research included topics such as Arabic music, the role of music in Islamic culture, and the relationship between music and religious practices.

=== Major publications ===
She authored several works, including The Cultural Atlas of Islam, co-authored with her husband, Ismail Raji al-Faruqi, and published posthumously by Macmillan. This book is a comprehensive resource on Islam's cultural and historical aspects, including its artistic expressions.

=== Scholarly contributions ===
Lois Lamya al-Faruqi's scholarly contributions include numerous articles and papers exploring various aspects of music, Islamic art, and culture. Her Ph.D. dissertation, "The Nature of the Musical Art of Islamic Culture: A Theoretical and Empirical Study of Arabian Music," provided an analysis of Arabian music, combining theoretical perspectives with empirical research.

She focused on articulating an Islamic perspective on music and examining Muslim musical practices. Her contributions in this area include An Annotated Glossary of Arabic Musical Terms, a resource for scholars studying Arabic music, and several articles on the role of music in Islamic societies.

=== Professional activities ===
Lois Lamya al-Faruqi was an active member of the Society for Ethnomusicology, serving on various committees, including as president and program chairman of the Mid-Atlantic Chapter. She promoted ethnomusicology in the Muslim world and represented that constituency to the broader community.

=== Additional roles ===
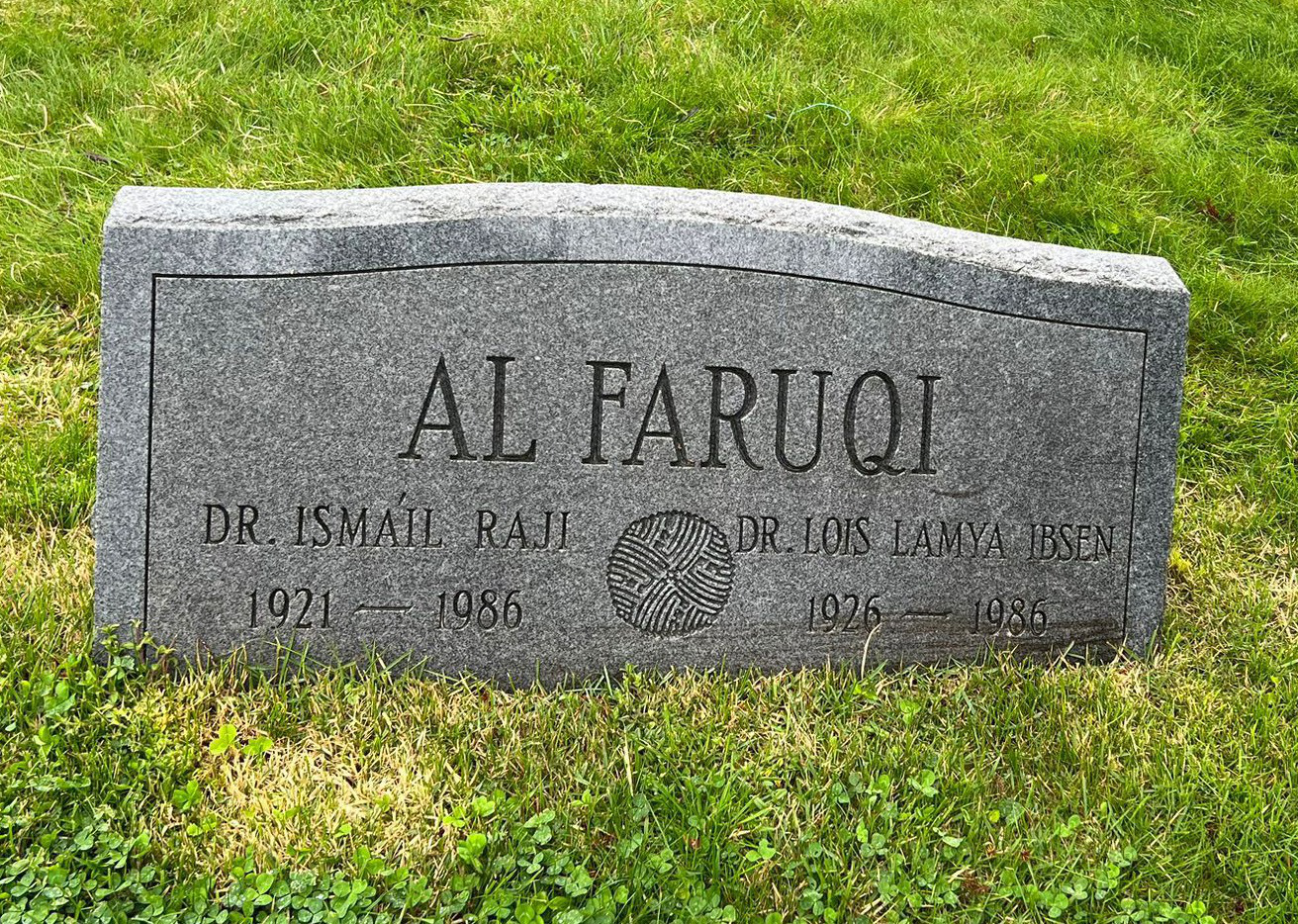
Shared grave of Lois Lamya al-Faruqi and her husband

In addition to her academic work, Lois Lamya al-Faruqi was involved in various professional activities, including lecturing, organizing conferences and exhibits, and participating in numerous organizations. She was a board member of the Islamic Arts Foundation and a member of the UNESCO working group to prepare a Universal Scientific and Cultural History of Mankind. She chaired the Arts and Literature Group of the Association of Muslim Social Scientists from 1975 until she died in 1986.

== Death ==
On May 27, 1986, Lois Lamya al-Faruqi and her husband were murdered in their home in Wyncote, Pennsylvania. The motivations behind the murders have been the subject of various theories, including a botched burglary and politically motivated assassination.

== Bibliography ==
=== Books ===
- An Annotated Glossary of Arabic Musical Terms. Westport, CT: Greenwood Press. 1981.
- The Cultural Atlas of Islam. NY: Macmillan. 1986.
- Women, Muslim Society, and Islam. IL: American Trust Publications. 2002.

=== Dissertation ===
- The Nature of the Musical Art of Islamic Culture: A Theoretical and Empirical Study of Arabian Music (Ph.D. dissertation). Syracuse University. 1974.

=== Articles ===
- "Ancient Arab Religion". Islamic Literature: 391–411. July 1969.
- Bardwell Smith, ed. (1971). The Relevance of Religion in a Study of Indian Ragamala Paintings. Chambersburg, PA: American Academy of Religion. pp. 83–104.
- "Women's Rights and the Muslim Woman". Islam and the Modern Age. 3 (2): 76–99. 1973.
- Al Faruqi, Lois Ibsen (1975). "Muwashshah: A Vocal Form in Islamic Culture". Ethnomusicology. 19 (1): 1–29. doi:10.2307/849744. JSTOR 849744.
- "The Aisled Hall and the Domed Chamber: Their Use in Islamic Culture". Islamic Culture. 50 (3): 155–167. 1976.
- "Dances of the Muslim Peoples". Dance Scope. 11 (1): 43–51. 1976–1977.
- Development and the Islamic Arts. Plainfield, IN: A.M.S.S. 1977. pp. 27–35.
- "The Aesthetics of Islamic Art: Afterwords". Journal of Aesthetics and Art Criticism. 35 (3): 353–355. 1977. doi:10.2307/430294. JSTOR 430294.
- Al Faruqi, Lois Ibsen (1978). "Accentuation in Qur'anic Chant: A Study in Musical Tawazun". Yearbook of the International Folk Music Council. 10: 53–68. doi:10.2307/767347. JSTOR 767347.
- "Al Muwashshah: Al Janib al Sawt fil al Thaqafah al Islamiyyah". Al-Kitharah (in Arabic) (52). Baghdad: 9–15, 54: 12–21. 1978.
- "An Extended Family Model from Islamic Culture". Journal of Comparative Family Studies. 9 (2): 243–256. 1978.
- "Dance as an Aesthetic Expression in Islamic Culture". Dance Research Journal. 10 (2): 6–13. 1978. doi:10.2307/1477998. JSTOR 1477998.
- "Ornamentation in Arabian Improvisational Music: A Study of Interrelatedness in the Arts". The World of Music. 20 (1): 17–32. 1978.
- Tartil al-Quran al-Karim. Leicester, UK: The Islamic Foundation. 1979. pp. 105–119.
- Nadia Chilkovsky Nahumck, ed. (1979). Dances of the Muslim People. New York: American Dance Guild, Inc. pp. 159–160.
- "Islamic Influences". Twelfth Congress report of the American Musicological Society. New Haven, CT: A.M.S. 1980. pp. 11–13.
- "The Status of Music in Muslim Nations: Evidence from the Arab World". Asian Music. 12 (1): 56–84. 1981.
- Al Ghazali on Sama'. Herndon, VA: International Institute of Islamic Thought. 1982. pp. 43–50.
- Artistic Acculturation and Diffusion among Muslims of the United States. Herndon, VA: International Institute of Islamic Thought. 1982. pp. 85–100.
- Henry O. Thompson, ed. (1982). God in Visual Aesthetic Expression: A Comparative Study in Transcendence Symbolization. New York: The Rose of Sharon Press. pp. 234–266.
- Islam and Aesthetic Expression. London: Longman, Islamic Council of Europe. 1982. pp. 191–212.
- "Islamization through Art: Implications for Education". Islamic Culture. 56 (1): 21–35. 1982.
- Muslim Women in Changing Environments. Vol. 2. New York: The International Cultural Foundation Press. 1982. pp. 797–801.
- "The Shari'ah on Music and Musicians". Islamic Thought and Culture. Herndon, VA: International Institute of Islamic Thought. 1982. pp. 27–52.
- "Wadl' al Musiqa fi al'Alam al Muslim". Al Muslim al Mu'asir (in Arabic). 8 (29): 107–131. 1982.
- Al Fann al Islami (in Arabic). London: n.p. 1983.
- Jalal Uddin Ahmed, ed. (1983). Islamic Art or Muslim Art?. London: Islamic Arts Foundation.
- Islamic Music. Vol. 14. New York: Funk and Wagnall. 1983. pp. 286–288.
- H. Wiley Hitchcock, Stanley Sadie, ed. (1983). Islamic Music, American. Vol. 2. New York: Macmillan. pp. 501–502.
- Nazarah al Islamiyyah Ila al Ramziyyah fi al Funun: Ara'Jadidah fi Fann al Taswir (in Arabic). London: N.p. 1983.
- John Richard Hayes, ed. (1983). The Andalusian Tradition (2nd ed.). Cambridge, MA: The MIT Press. pp. 144–145.
- John Richard Hayes, ed. (1983). The Golden Age of Arab Music (2nd ed.). Cambridge, MA: The MIT Press. p. 142.
- Joyce Irwin, ed. (1983). What Makes 'Religious Music' Religious?. JAAR Thematic Studies. Vol. 50. Chico, CA: Scholar's Press. pp. 21–34.
- "Factors of Continuity in the Musical Cultures of the Muslim World". Progress Reports in Ethnomusicology. 1 (2): 1–18. 1983–1984.
- Diane Apostolos-Cappadona, ed. (1984). An Islamic Perspective on Symbolism in the Arts: New Thoughts on Figural Representation. New York: The Crossroad Publishing Company. pp. 164–178.
- Yvonne Haddad; Byron Haines; Ellison Findly, eds. (1984). Unity and Variety in the Music of Islamic Culture. Syracuse, NY: Syracuse University Press. pp. 175–194.
- "The Suite in Islamic History and Culture". The World of Music. 27 (3): 46–64. 1985.
- "Ibn Sina's Contribution in the Field of Music Theory". Proceedings of the Symposium on Ibn Sina (Avicenna). Kuala Lumpur: University of Malaya. 1986.
- Al Faruqi, Lois Lamya' (1986). "Islamization Through the Sound Arts". The American Journal of Islamic Social Sciences. 3 (2): 171–180. doi:10.35632/ajis.v3i2.2892.
- Al Faruqi, Lois Ibsen (1988). "The Cantillation of the Qur'an". Asian Music. 19 (1): 2–25. doi:10.2307/833761. JSTOR 833761.
- "The Sleeping Rabbit Lost the Race". North Star. 1 (1): 3–6. n.d.
- "Women In a Quranic Society". Archived from the original on November 26, 2004.
- "Islamic Traditions & The Feminist Movement: Confrontation or Co-operation?". Archived from the original on December 4, 2004.

== See also ==
- Ismail al-Faruqi
