= Lohoof =

Shia book

Lohoof (Sighs of Sorrow)
- Author: Sayyed Ibn Tawus
- Language: English
- Published: 2014; Createspace Independent Pub; Published by Jaffria Propagation Centre, Mumbai; Kashmiri translation by Raheislam Organisationموسسہ راہ اسلام, Wahabpora
- Publication place: Iraq Iraq
- Media type: Print
- Pages: 158
- ISBN: 9781494883652

Lohoof (Arabic: لُهوف) is a book by Sayyed Ibn Tawus, a Shia jurist, theologian, and historian. It is kind of Maqtal al-Husayn (Arabic: مقتل الحسين), narrating the Battle of Karbala, the death of Husayn ibn Ali, and subsequent events.

== Title ==
The root of Lohoof is Lahaf (Arabic: لهف), which means "sighs of sorrow".

== Author ==
Radhi ud-Deen Ali ibn Musa ibn Tawus (1193–1266 AD), often called Sayyed Ibn Tawus (Arabic: سید ابن طاووس), was a Shia jurist, theologian and historian. He was descended from Hasan ibn Ali through his father and from Husayn ibn Ali through his mother. It is said that he met the twelfth Shia Imam, Muhammad al-Mahdi (869–941), who, according to Shia belief, was or is living in occultation.

Ibn Tawus is known for his library and his numerous works, which are still available in their original form and are considered good sources for learning about the concerns and teachings of Muslim scholars at the end of the Abbasid era.

== Background ==
Sayyed Ibn Tawus had authored the book titled Mesbah-u-Zaer (Arabic: مصباح الزایر) about pilgrims (Arabic: زیارت) to the holy shrine of Muhammad, prophet of Islam, and the twelve Imams. After a while, ibn Tawus decided to write a biographical essay about Husayn ibn Ali, the Battle of Karbala and its immediate aftermath; he named this essay "Lohoof". The essential information was collected in this book.

== Context ==
Lohoof includes sections on Husayn ibn Ali, the Battle of Karbala, and its aftermath, in three parts:

1. The events that occurred just before the day of Ashura (10th of Muharram of 61 AH);
2. The events that occurred in the evening before Ashura, and during the day of Ashura;
3. The events that occurred after the day of Ashura, with regard to Husayn ibn Ali, his family, and his enemies.

In the preface to the book we see this statement: "The importance of books such as Lohoof lies in its right, just, and authentic references and accurate narrations, which reveal the history of the 14th century."

== Sources used ==
The following sources were used by ibn Tawus in the writing of Lohoof:

- Iqab al-a'mal of Ibn Babawayh
- The reasons for Imamah of Muhammad ibn Jarir al-Tabari.

Several sources that ibn Tawus did not explicitly name but apparently used are:

- Kitab al-fotuh of Ahmad ibn A'tham
- Maqtal al-Husayn of Muhammad ibn Musa al-Khwarizmi
- Amali of Ahmed ibn Ibrahim Hasani Zaydi
- Al-Irshad of Al-Shaykh Al-Mufid

== Reception ==
Anyone who has written about the killing of Husayn ibn Ali has most certainly consulted Lohoof, which are actually adventures narrated by Sayyed ibn Tawus. In Lohoof, ibn Tawus writes about the most important events of the Battle of Karbala, such as the decision to return the captured family of Muhammad, prophet of Islam, to Karbala on Arba'een. Sayyed ibn Tawus collected some texts about the killing of Husayn ibn Ali. He emphasized that Husayn ibn Ali was aware of his killing at Karbala. The following statement had been included in most versions of Lohoof: "Certainly Allah had wanted to see him killed and women captured".

== See also ==
- Sermon of Zaynab bint Ali in the court of Yazid
- Sermon of Ali ibn Husayn in Damascus
- Mourning of Muharram
- List of casualties in Husayn's army at the Battle of Karbala
