= Hadith of Rayyan-bin Shabib =

The hadith of Ibn al-Shabib or the hadith of 'Rayyan bin Al-Shabib' is the title of a narrative that is mentioned in the sources of Shia to express the position of month of Muharam, the incidents that happened in it and the Battle of Karbala.

Regarding the authenticity of the narration and the reliability or trustworthiness of all of the narrators, it has been considered to be a reliable or at least a trustworthy narration. This narration has been quoted in a few sources such as Amali Sheikh Sadouq and Ayun Akhbar al-Reza, by a person named Rayyan bin al-Shabib from Ali al-Reza- The Imam.

To confirm the authenticity of the narration, the Shiite scholars of tradition have pointed out the evidence of issuance, spiritual sequence and the principle of tolerance in the reasons of traditions, in addition to the authenticity of the document.

The content of the tradition contains some words in remembering praying days, features of month of Muharram and the beginning day of it, the accident of Karbala, the necessity of Husseini renaissance through mourning and expressing methods to mourn. The final part of the tradition also covers some wonderful and miraculous incidents like the rain of blood and red and black storms happening after martyrdom of Hussein bin-Ali.

== Content ==
The narration of Rayyan bin-Shabib which is quoted by Ali al-Reza, is one of the most famous narrations about mourning for Hussein ibn Ali to which most of the Maqtals have referred. This narration starts with stating the honor of sacrificing in Haram months, and goes on with referring to the murderers of Ali ibn-Hussain in the month of Muharram. based on this narration, Rayyan bin-Shabib had a conversation with Ali al-Reza when he met him in the first day of Muharram. Ali al-Reza mentioned the importance, incidents and acts performed in this day like the supplication of Zakaria for wishing for children and its coming true by God that should be noted, he also talked about the battle of Karbala and its features. Ali al-Reza also points out the necessity of Husseini renaissance in this day, and notes the importance of mourning for Ali ibn Hussein through 'O Ibn Shabib if you want to cry, cry for Hussein ibn-Ali'.
