= Maqtal al-Husayn =

Various books of the battle of Karbala

Maqtal al-Husayn (Arabic: مقتل الحسين, lit. 'The Murder Place of Husayn') is the title of various books written by different authors throughout the centuries which narrate the story of the battle of Karbala and the death of Husayn ibn Ali. They were first written in the eighth century.

== Maqtal ==
Books recounting the death of revered Muslim individuals were composed in large numbers during the eighth and ninth centuries and even today among Muslims are defined as Maqtal.

== List of famous Maqtals ==
- Maqtal al-Husayn, Ibn Sa'd died in 230 AH (845CE)
- Maqtal al-Husayn, Baladhuri died in 283 AH (892 CE)
- Maqtal al-Husayn, Dinawari
- Maqtal al-Husayn, Ibn A'tham died in 314AH (926-27 CE)

Maqtals that have not survived:

- Maqtal al-Husayn, Abi Mikhnaf died in 157 AH (774 CE)
- Maqtal al-Husayn of Muhammad bin Amr Waqidi (d. 207 or 209 AH), a mention of which book has been made by Ibn Nadim and Yaqut al-Hamawi
- Maqtal al-Husayn that was written by Abu ‘Ubaydah Mu‘mmar bin Muthannà (d. 209 AH) and which was in the possession of Ibn Tawus (d. 664 AH)
- Maqtal al-Husayn written by Nasr bin Muzaham Manqari (d. 212 AH). This maqtal has been mentioned in the works of Ibn Nadím and al-Najashi.
- Maqtal al-Husayn, Abi Ubayd Qasim bin Salim Hirawi (d. 224 AH)
- Maqtal al-Husayn, Abi al- Hasan Ali bin Muhammad Madaini (d. 224/225 AH) a mention of which has been made by Ibn Shahr Àshêb.
- Maqtal al-Husayn, Abdullah ibn Muhammad, known by his epithet of Ibn Abi al-Dunya (d. 281 AH)
- Maqtal al-Husayn, Ya'qubi who has made a brief reference to battle of Karbala in his book Tarikh had also written a separate book under the name Maqtal al-Husayn.
- Maqtal al-Husayn, Abi Abdullah Muhammad ibn Zakariyya al-Ghalabi (d. 298 AH)
- Maqtal al-Husayn, Abi Abdullah ibn Muhammad ibn Shahanshah Baghawi Baghdadi (d. 317 AH) had also written a book called Maqtal al-Husayn

== See also ==
- Lohoof
- Hussain ibn Ali
- Battle of Karbala
- List of casualties in Husayn's army at the Battle of Karbala
