= Sulayman ibn Surad =

Islamic leader from Kufa (died 685)

Sulayman ibn Surad سُلَيْمَان ٱبْن صُرَد
- Born: Arabia
- Died: 4 January 685; Ras al-Ayn, Syria
- Military career
- Allegiance: Rashidun Caliphate
- Service years: 656–685
- Conflicts: First Fitna; Battle of the Camel; Battle of Siffin; Second Fitna; Tawwabin uprising; Battle of Ayn al-Warda †

Sulayman ibn Surad al-Khuza'i (Arabic: سُلَيْمَان ٱبْن صُرَد ٱلْخُزَاعِيّ, romanized: Sulaymān ibn Ṣurad al-Khuzāʿī; died January 685) was a pro-Alid leader from Kufa, who led the Tawwabin movement during the Second Fitna to avenge the death of Husayn ibn Ali, a grandson of the Islamic prophet Muhammad. He had participated in battles during the First Fitna on the side of the fourth caliph Ali, although at occasions was disapproving of his decisions. After the death of Mu'awiya I, he was the most prominent of the Kufans who urged Ali's son Husayn to revolt. After the death of Husayn at the Battle of Karbala in 680, in which he failed to support Husayn, Ibn Surad and some other Alid partisans of Kufa sacrificed themselves in an attempt to avenge his death.

== Early life ==
The majority of sources assert that he was a companion of the Islamic prophet Muhammad, although some sources state he was one of the second generation of Muslims (Tabi'un). Muhammad is said to have changed his name from Yasar to Sulayman. He was one of the earliest Alid partisans of Kufa. Although his participation in the Battle of the Camel (656) is disputed, he had fought alongside caliph Ali at the Battle of Siffin (657), where he commanded the right wing of Ali's infantry. When Ali agreed to talks under pressure from his supporters in response to arbitration proposal from the army of his rival, Mu'awiya, Ibn Surad strongly opposed the decision. Following the death of Ali in January 661, his eldest son Hasan was elected caliph, but shortly afterwards abdicated in favor of Mu'awiya. Ibn Surad was critical of Hasan's decision. According to a report by Arab historian al-Baladhuri, two years after Hasan's abdication, Kufan pro-Alids led by Ibn Surad offered Hasan support of 40,000 troops and encouraged him to resume war against Mu'awiya, but Hasan rejected the offer. When Hasan died in 670, Sulayman unsuccessfully tried to persuade Husayn, the younger brother of Hasan, to revolt against Mu'awiya.

== Tawwabin movement ==
After the death of Mu'awiya in April 680, his son and nominated successor, Yazid became caliph. With Hasan already dead, Ibn Surad and other prominent pro-Alids of Kufa urged Hasan's younger brother Husayn to lead them in revolt against Yazid, but then failed to aid him. Husayn was killed along with his small band of followers, a few among them Kufans, by the Umayyad forces at the Battle of Karbala on 10 October 680.

Husayn's death aroused a deep sense of guilt in senior Alid partisans of Kufa, who considered themselves responsible for Husayn's death. Five senior among them met at Ibn Surad's house and decided to fight the Umayyads to atone for their sin, hence the term Tawwabin (penitents). Ibn Surad was declared commander of the movement. Since Kufa was under strong grip of the Umayyad governor Ubayd Allah ibn Ziyad, the Tawwabin movement remained secret for some time. Nevertheless, they soon had following of one hundred other men. Every Friday, they would gather at Ibn Surad's house and he would address them:

Do it, like the old Israelites, after they worshiped the golden calf! When Moses said to them, "You have sinned severely, atone through death!”, they patiently stretched out their necks and offered themselves to the knife, realizing that this was the only way they could free themselves from their guilt. So you too; prepare for death, sharpen your swords and lances and procure war equipment and horses.

Yazid died in November 683, and the Umayyad authority collapsed everywhere. People of Iraq drove out Ibn Ziyad and recognized the Mecca based counter-caliph Abd Allah ibn al-Zubayr. Ibn al-Zubayr appointed Abd Allah ibn Yazid his governor of Kufa. Ibn Yazid's sympathetic attitude towards the Tawwabin gave them the opportunity to come in open. At the same time, Mukhtar al-Thaqafi, another pro-Alid, was also advocating the retaliation for Husayn's death and establishment of an Alid caliphate in the name of Husayn's half-brother Muhammad ibn al-Hanafiyya. This led to competition for the following between the two. Mukhtar warned Ibn Surad's followers that Ibn Surad was weak and old, and that he was inexperienced in leadership and war matters. Despite Mukhtar's efforts, Ibn Surad was able to retain most of his followers. Some of his followers were inclined to punish the tribal notables of Kufa, who too were involved in the killing of Husayn, but Ibn Surad rejected the idea asserting that Umayyads were the real culprits, and that it was unwise to antagonize the influential tribal chiefs. Around 16,000 Kufan men enlisted in Ibn Surad's register. In addition, he secured support from Alid sympathizers of al-Mada'in and Basra.

=== Battle of Ayn al-Warda ===
Ibn Surad and his followers left Kufa on 15 November 684, and camped outside the city. Only 4,000 people were present and there was nobody from al-Mada'in or Basra. After three days of wait, the Tawwabin set out for Karbala. Although his soldiers wanted to wait for their comrades from Basra and al-Mada'in, Ibn Surad refused further delay. They spent a day of mourning at Husayn's grave. Another 1000 men were missing by now. Undeterred by decreasing numbers, Ibn Surad exclaimed that departure of such people from their ranks was good, and ordered his companions to march. They took route along Euphrates and met the Umayyad army led by Ibn Ziyad at Ayn al-Warda, on the border of Syria. The battle started on 4 January 685. After gaining some advantage on the first day, Tawwabin began to lose because of numerical superiority of the Syrians. On the third and decisive day of the battle, Ibn Surad was killed by an arrow shot. Most of the Tawwabin including four of their five most senior leaders were killed. Survivors retreated and went on to join the revolt of Mukhtar.

== Bibliography ==
- Wellhausen, Julius (1901). Die religiös-politischen Oppositionsparteien im alten Islam (in German). Berlin: Weidmannsche Buchhandlung. pp. 71–74. OCLC 453206240.
- Kohlberg, Etan (1997). "Sulaymān b. Surad". In Bosworth, C. E.; van Donzel, E. J.; Heinrichs, W. P.; Lecomte, G. (eds.). Encyclopaedia of Islam. Vol. 9 (Second ed.). Leiden: BRILL. pp. 826–827. ISBN 90-04-10422-4.
- Dixon, Abd al-Ameer A. (1971). The Umayyad Caliphate, 65-86/684-705: (a Political Study). London: Luzac. p. 37. ISBN 978-0718901493.
- Halm, Heinz (1997). Shia Islam: From Religion to Revolution. Translated by Allison Brown. Princeton: Markus Wiener Publishers. p. 17–19. ISBN 1-55876-134-9.
- Jafri, S. M. (1979). Origins and Early Development of Shi'a Islam. London and New York: Longman. p. 231. ISBN 9780582780804.
- Morony, Michael (1984). Iraq After the Muslim Conquest. Princeton: Princeton University Press. p. 485. ISBN 0-691-05395-2.
- Dakake, Maria M. (2007). Charismatic Community, The: Shi'ite Identity in Early Islam. Albany, New York: State University of New York Press. p. 77. ISBN 978-0-7914-7033-6.
