= Sermon of Ali al-Sajjad =

The Sermon of Ali al-Sajjad (Arabic: خُطْبَة عَلِيّ ٱبْن ٱلْحُسَيْن فِي ٱلشَّام) was a set of statements of Ali ibn Husayn in the presence of Umayyad caliph Yazid I in Damascus. After the Battle of Karbala, the captured family of Muhammad, the Islamic prophet, and the heads of those killed were moved to the Levant by the forces of Yazid. By order of Yazid, a pulpit was prepared, and a public speaker gave a lecture that placed blame on Ali and Husayn ibn Ali. In reply to Yazid's speaker, Ali Ibn Husayn introduced himself and his ancestors. Also, he recounted the events leading to the death of Husayn ibn Ali.

== Ali al-Sajjad ==
Ali al-Sajjad (Arabic: عَلِيّ ٱبْن ٱلْحُسَيْن), also known as Zayn al-Abidin (Arabic: زَيْن ٱلْعَابِدِين, "Adornment of the Worshippers"), was the fourth Shia Imam, after his father Husayn. Ali al-Sajjad survived the Battle of Karbala and was taken, along with enslaved women, to the caliph in Damascus. Eventually, he was allowed to return to Medina, where he led a secluded life with a few intimate companions. Zayn al-Abidin's life and statements were entirely devoted to asceticism and religious teachings, mostly in the form of invocations and supplications. His famous supplications are known as Al-Sahifa al-Sajjadiyya.

== Background ==
After the Battle of Karbala, the captured family of Muhammad and the heads of those killed were moved to the Levant by the forces of Yazid. According to Turabi, on the first day of Safar they arrived in the Levant (Damascus) and were taken into Yazid's presence.

According to Bihar al-Anwar, Yazid ordered a pulpit to be constructed in Damascus. He designated a public speaker to blame Ali and Husayn ibn Ali. The public speaker sat at the pulpit and began his lecture by praising Allah and insulting Ali and his son, Husayn. Also, he devoted a long time to praising Yazid and his father Muawiyah. In the middle of the lecture, Ali ibn Husayn called out to him and said: "O you who preach! Woe be to you! You have bought the wrath of the Creator in lieu of the pleasure of the creatures, while your place is hell." Then he turned towards Yazid and said: "Do you permit me to speak that which would be agreeable to Allah and would be a means of reward for those present?" Yazid refused, but the people said, "Permit him to ascend the pulpit. Perhaps we may hear something (worthwhile) from him." Yazid replied, "If I permit him to mount the pulpit, he shall not descend it until he humiliates me and the progeny of Abu Sufyan." They said, "How could this ailing youth do such a thing?' Yazid replied, "He comes from a family that has from infancy consumed wisdom along with their milk." Yazid finally relented, and Ali ibn Husayn ascended the pulpit and gave his sermon.(According to Kamile Bahai, Ali ibn Husayn asked Yazid to let him give the sermon on Friday.)

== Context ==
Ali ibn Husayn began his sermon by praising Allah.

Praise be to Allah Who has no beginning, and the Everlasting Who has no end. The foremost Whose beginning has no beginning, and the Last Whose end has no end.

Then he said about the knowledge, forbearance, munificence, eloquence, valor, and friendship of Ahl al-Bayt and also the name of Hamza ibn Abdul-Muttalib and Ja'far ibn Abi Talib.

O people! We have been bestowed six qualities and seven merits (by Allah). Knowledge, forbearance, munificence, eloquence, valor and friendship in the hearts of the believers are present in us. While our merits are that the Prophet in Authority is from amongst us; the Truthful (Imam Ali) is from amongst us; the Flyer (Ja’far at Tayyar) is from amongst us; the Lion of Allah, and that of His Prophet, is from amongst us; while also the two Sibtain (Hasan and Husayn) of this nation are from amongst us. Those who know me, know me, while those who do not know me, I reveal my pedigree and ancestry for them until they recognize me.

He drew attention to criteria that indicated the eligibility of Ahl al-Bayt for the succession of Muhammad. It was in this way that he introduced himself, saying that there was no need to introduce himself to people who knew him, but that he was introducing himself for those who did not know him.

=== The son of Mecca and Mina ===
Ali ibn Husayn introduced himself as son of Mecca and Mina.

O people! I am the son of Mecca and of Mina. I am the son of Zamzam and Safa.

With these sentences, he stated that his ancestors reached back to Abraham, who had constructed the Kaaba. He added that it was important to remember that people who honor the Kaaba must revere Ali ibn Husayn as the son of Mecca. In other words, anyone who did not respect Ali ibn Husayn was, in fact, blaspheming all that was sacred.

=== The son of Muhammad ===
I am the son of the one who was taken up to the Sidrat al-Muntaha. I am the son of the one "who was bestowed revelation by the Almighty, what He did reveal" (again referring to the night of Me’raj. For all the above verses refer Surah an-Najm, Surah No. 53). I am the son of Muhammad, the Chosen One!

=== The son of Ali ===
I am the son of person who fought against enemies with two swords. He emigrated twice, pledged allegiance twice (to the prophet), and prayed in the two Qibla. I am the son of Ali, the Approved One.

=== The son of Fatimah bint Muhammad ===
I am the son of Fatemah az-Zahra.

=== The son of who was killed at battle of Karbala ===
I am the son of Husayn, the one killed at Karbala. I am the son of the one who was smeared in blood and sand. I am the son of the one who was lamented upon by the genie in the darkness of the night. I am the son of the one who was mourned by the birds.

=== Call to pray ===
When Ali ibn Husayn said these statements, Yazid ordered the moazzin to call people for prayers. While the mu'azzin said: "I bear witness that Muhammad is the Messenger of Allah", Ali ibn Husayn stated:

O Yazid! This Honorable and Noble Messenger is my Grandfather or yours? If you say that he is your grandfather, then the entire world knows that you speak a lie. And if you say that he is my grandfather, then why did you kill my father with tyranny, and plunder his belongings and captivate his womenfolk?

Yazid knew that it was in his best interest not to answer, so he ordered the mu'azzin to continue.

== Effect ==
After delivering the sermon, those in the audience began to cry. They gathered around Ali ibn Husayn to apologize.

== See also ==
- Sermon of Zaynab bint Ali in the court of Yazid
- Battle of Karbala
