= Abu Mikhnaf =

8th-century Muslim historian

- لُوط بْن يَحْيَى بْن سَعِيد الأَزْدِيّ

Personal life
- Born: c. 689
- Died: 157 AH (773/774 CE)
- Era: Islamic golden age
- Main interest: History of Islam
- Notable work(s): Kitab Al-Saqifa, Kitab Al-Ridda, Kitab Al-Shura, Kitab Al-Jamal, Kitab Al-Siffin, Kitab Maqtal Al-Hasan, Kitab Maqtal Al-Husayn, Sirat Al-Hussayn, ...

Religious life
- Religion: Islam
- Denomination: Shia

Muslim leader
- Influenced: Tabari

Lut ibn Yahya ibn Sa'id al-Azdi (Arabic: لُوط بْن يَحْيَى بْن سَعِيد الأَزْدِيّ, romanized: Lūṭ ibn Yaḥyā ibn Saʿīd al-ʾAzdī; c. 689–773/775), commonly known by his kunya Abu Mikhnaf (Arabic: أَبُو مِخنَف, romanized: ʾAbū Mikhnaf), was an early Muslim historian.

== Life ==
Abu Mikhnaf was born in c. 689. His given name was Lut and his father was Yahya ibn Sa'id ibn Mikhnaf, who belonged to a noble clan of the powerful Azd tribe resident in Kufa. His great-grandfather was Mikhnaf ibn Sulaym a chieftain of the Azd and the commander of his tribesmen in the army of 'Ali (r. 656–661) at the Battle of Siffin in 657. He was reportedly the maternal cousin of Aisha, and was later killed among the Tawwabin uprising in 685. Mikhnaf's brothers, Saq'ab and Abdullah, were killed in the Battle of the Camel. Mikhnaf's son Muhammad, Abu Mikhnaf's paternal granduncle, was seventeen-years-old at Siffin and his reports of the battle were recorded by Abu Mikhnaf. He witnessed the mass Iraqi revolt led by Ibn al-Ash'ath against the Umayyad Caliphate in 700 and the toppling of the Umayyads by the Abbasids in 750. He was a friend of Muhammad ibn Sa'ib al-Kalbi and it was through the latter's son Hisham ibn al-Kalbi that much of Abu Mikhnaf's volumes were transmitted. He died in 774/75.

== Historiography ==
Abu Mikhnaf was the oldest Arab prose writer, an Akhbari (propagator of news or traditions), an important source of early Iraqi historical traditions, and main source of the history of al-Tabari. Abu Mikhnaf is the latter’s almost exclusive source for the events in Iraq during the long governorship of al-Hajjaj ibn Yusuf (694–714), the Zubayrid and Umayyad conflict with the Azariqa rebels in Persia (684–698) and the expedition of Ibn al-Ash'ath against Sistan (699–700).

As a hadith transmitter, he is regarded as weak and unreliable by Sunni rijal scholars. The hadith scholar Yahya ibn Ma'in stated that “He is not reliable” and Ibn ‘Adiyy said “A flaming Shi’ite who is the transmitter of their reports".

Some have interpreted his historical narratives to generally reflect a Kufan or Iraqi bias, rather than a purely Shia point of view.

He has presented narratives in abundance of details and fullness, in strikingly frank and arresting manner, in form of dialogue and staging, which he had gathered through independent enquiries, collection of facts and seeking first hand information, but he has not ignored other traditionists, older than or contemporary with himself, for instance, he has used such authorities as, Amir al-Sha'bi, al-Rasibi, Mujalid ibn Sa'id, and Muhammad ibn Sa'ib al-Kalbi.

Ibn Asakir in his book Ta'rikh madinat Dimashq has listed Ibn Al Kalbi as transmitter of Abu Mikhnaf in several places. Abd al-Malik ibn Nawfal ibn Musahiq who lived in first half of the second century Hijri, Abd al-Rahman ibn Jundab, al-Hajjaj ibn Ali, and Numayr ibn Walah were authority on Abu Mikhnaf.

In "Islamic Historiography", "Chase F. Robinson" has put him in the class of Ibn Ishaq and among the first Muslim historians who contributed about 40 titles in historical tradition of which no fewer than thirteen titles were monographic maqtal works. His monographs were gathered by later historians like Al-Baladhuri and Al-Tabari in their collections. Many Sunni scholars like Al-Dhahabi, Yahya ibn Ma'in, Al-Daraqutni, and Abu Hatim have been critical of him.

== Works ==
Ibn Nadim in his al-Fihrist lists 22, and al-Najashi lists 28 monographs composed by Abu Mikhnaf, comprising:

- Kitab Al-Saqifa (The book of Saqifah)
- Kitab Al-Ridda (The book of Ridda wars)
- Kitab Al-Shura (The book of The election of Uthman)
- Kitab Al-Jamal (The book of Battle of Basra)
- Kitab Al-Siffin (The book of Battle of Siffin)
- Kitab Maqtal Al-Hasan
- Kitab Maqtal Al-Husayn (The history of Battle of Karbala)
- Sirat Al-Hussayn
- Kitab Khutba Al-Zahra
- Kitab Akhbar Al-Mukhtar
- Futuh Al Sham (Conquest of Syria)

=== Maqtal Al-Husayn ===
He was the first historian to systematically collect the reports dealing with the events of the Battle of Karbala, which took place 9 years before his birth. His work was considered reliable among later Shi'a but not Sunnis. He has based his work on the eyewitness testimony of Muhammad ibn Qays, Harith ibn Abd Allah ibn Sharik al-Amiri, Abd Allah ibn Asim and Dahhak ibn Abd Allah Abu, Abu Janab al-Kalbi and Adi b. Hurmula.

=== Futuh Al Sham ===
Various works titled Futuh Al Sham by al-Azdi, Ibn al-Kalbi, Ibn A'tham and al-Waqidi were based on Abu Mikhnaf's Futuh Al Sham. Both Ibn ʿAsākīr and Al-Balādhurī traced their narratives back to Abū Mikhnaf.

== Bibliography ==
- Fishbein, Michael, ed. (1990). The History of al-Ṭabarī, Volume XXI: The Victory of the Marwānids, A.D. 685–693/A.H. 66–73. SUNY Series in Near Eastern Studies. Albany, New York: State University of New York Press. ISBN 978-0-7914-0221-4.
- Robinson, Chase F. (2003), Cambridge University Press, ISBN 0-521-62936-5
- Howard, I. K. A., ed. (1990). The History of al-Ṭabarī, Volume XIX: The Caliphate of Yazīd ibn Muʿāwiyah, A.D. 680–683/A.H. 60–64. SUNY Series in Near Eastern Studies. Albany, New York: State University of New York Press. ISBN 978-0-7914-0040-1.
- Rowson, Everett K., ed. (1989). The History of al-Ṭabarī, Volume XXII: The Marwānid Restoration: The Caliphate of ʿAbd al-Malik, A.D. 693–701/A.H. 74–81. SUNY Series in Near Eastern Studies. Albany, New York: State University of New York Press. ISBN 978-0-88706-975-8.
- Landau-Tasseron, Ella, ed. (1998). The History of al-Ṭabarī, Volume XXXIX: Biographies of the Prophet's Companions and their Successors: al-Ṭabarī's Supplement to his History. SUNY Series in Near Eastern Studies. Albany, New York: State University of New York Press. ISBN 978-0-7914-2819-1.
- Wellhausen, Julius (1927). The Arab Kingdom and its Fall. Translated by Margaret Graham Weir. Calcutta: University of Calcutta. OCLC 752790641.
