= Sermon of Zaynab bint Ali in the court of Yazid =

7th statements in Islamic history

Sermon of Zaynab bint Ali in the court of Yazid are the statements made by Zaynab bint Ali in the presence of Yazid I in the aftermath of the Battle of Karbala when the captive family members of Muhammad, prophet of Islam, and the heads of those murdered were moved to the Levant (equivalent to the historical region of Syria) by the forces of Yazid I. Zaynab delivered a defiant sermon in the court of Yazid in which she humiliated Yazid and exposed his army's atrocities while honoring the Ahl al-Bayt and those killed in Karbala and expounding upon the eternal consequences of the battle.

== Zaynab bint Ali ==
Zaynab bint Ali (Arabic: زَيْنَب بِنْت عَلِيّ) was one of the daughters of Ali and Fatimah. Like other members of her family she became a great figure of sacrifice, strength, and piety in Islam – in both the Sunni and Shia sects of the religion. Zaynab married Abdullah ibn Ja'far and had three sons and two daughters. When her brother Husayn defended Islam and opposed the tyranny of Yazid caliph in 680 AD (61 AH), Zaynab accompanied his companions, 72 men who, together with Husayn, were brutally slain by government forces numbering 30,000 men at the Battle of Karbala. Zaynab played an important role in disclosing the true events leading up to the massacre of the third Shia Imam Husayn, and his supporters. She also protected the life of her nephew Ali ibn Husayn Zayn al-Abidin, the fourth Shia Imam, as he lay seriously ill and unable to go to the battlefield. Because of her sacrifice and heroism, she became known as the "Hero of Karbala". Zaynab died in 681, and her shrine is located in Damascus, Syria which is regarded by many sources as her actual burial site, in contrast to other attributions such as the one in Egypt.

== Background ==
After the battle of Karbala the captured family of the prophet and the heads of those who were killed were taken to the Levant by the forces of Yazid. On the first day of the month of Safar, according to Turabi, they arrived in the Levant and the captured family and heads were taken into Yazid's presence. First, the identity of each head was told to him. Then he paid attention to a woman who was objecting. Yazid asked, "Who is this arrogant woman?" All the audience paused for a moment. The woman rose to answer and said: "Why are you asking them [the woman]? Ask me. I'll tell you [who I am]. I am Muhammad's granddaughter. I am Fatima's daughter." People at the court were impressed and amazed by her.

According to the narration of Al-Shaykh Al-Mufid, in Yazid's presence a man with red skin asked Yazid for one of the captured women to be his slave. Yazid hit the lips and teeth of Hussein with his stick while saying: "I wish those of my clan who were killed at Badr, and those who had seen the Khazraj clan wailing (in the battle of Uhad) on account of lancet wounds, were here. At this time, Zaynab bint Ali began to give her sermon.

== Context ==
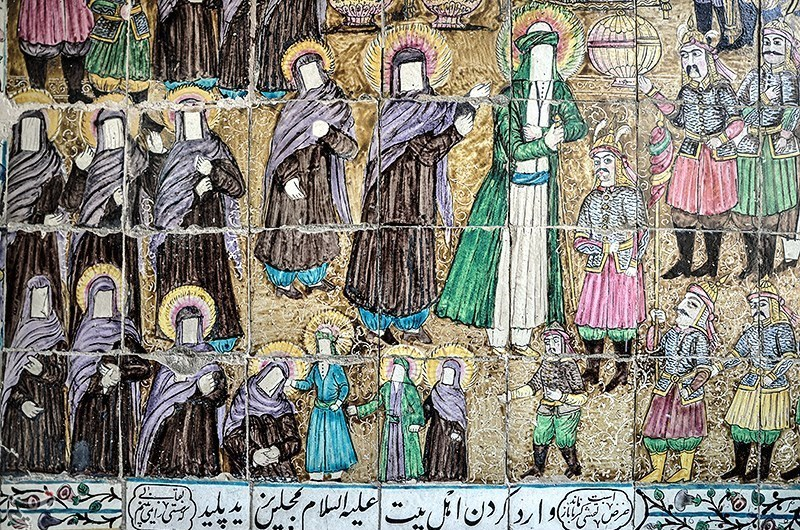
Tilework inside Mu'awin ul-Mulk Hussainiya, Kermanshah, Iran, depicting Ali ibn Husayn, Zaynab, and other prisoners taken to the Yazdi court

Zaynab bint Ali started her sermon with the praise of Allah:

In the name of Allah, The most Gracious, the most Merciful. All praise is due to Allah, the Lord of the worlds. May praise and salutations be upon my grandfather, the leader of Allah's messengers and upon his progeny.

=== God gives time to disbelievers ===
Verse 178 of chapter of Al Imran was descended about polytheists of Mecca such as Abu Sufyan ibn Harb. Zainab bint Ali once again relates this verse to Yazid, grandson of Abu Sufyan ibn Harb. She said: "Do not be satisfied with this temporal achievement; this time passes quickly and Allah will punish you. You will be humiliated."

As we see in the sermon:

O Yazid! Do you think that we have become humble and despicable owing to the martyrdom of our people and our own captivity? Do you think that by killing the godly persons you have become great and respectable and the Almighty looks at you with special grace and kindness? You have, however, forgotten what Allah says: The disbelievers must not think that our respite is for their good We only give them time to let them increase their sins. For them there will be a humiliating torment. (Quran 3:178 ^{(Yusuf Ali)})

=== Humiliate the enemy and honoring the Ahl al-Bayt ===
One concern of Zaynab bint Ali in the battle of Karbala was the humiliation of the enemy and the honor of the Ahl al-Bayt.

O son of the freed ones! Is it justice that you keep your women and slave-girls in seclusion but have made the helpless daughters of the Holy Prophet ride on swift camels and given them in the hands of their enemies so that they may take them from one city to another

=== Position of those killed in Karbala ===
Zaynab bint Ali told Yazid not to be happy because of his victory. She named verse 169 of Al Imran and emphasized that those dying for a just cause are victors and that Yazid's happiness will end with the torture of Allah.

It will be the day when Allah will deliver the descendants of the Holy Prophet from the state of being scattered and will bring all of them together in Paradise. This is the promise which Allah has made in the Holy Quran. Do not think of those who are slain for the cause of Allah as dead. They are alive with their Lord and receive sustenance from Him.(Quran 3:169 ^{(Yusuf Ali)})

=== Referring to the oppression ===
At this point in the sermon she referred to all the oppression and injustices of the Umayyad from time of Abu Sufyan till the time of Yazid ibn Muawiyah. She also believed that the Umayyad owed their power to the Islamic Ummah's failure to uphold the Quran and the rightful succession to Muhammad. She further stated that:

Our blood is dripping from their hands and our flesh is falling down from their mouths.

=== External consequences of the battle ===
Zaynab bint Ali stated that the battle of Karbala had a positive effect on history. She believed that jihad, struggle in the path of Allah, had eternal effects.

You (Yazid) may employ your deceit and cunning efforts, but I swear by Allah that the shame and disgrace which you have earned by the treatment meted out to us cannot be eradicated.

== Perspectives ==
In his book, Explanations on Sermon of Zaynab bint Ali at the Levant, published by Bustan publications, Ali Karimi Jahromi reviews different opinions about this sermon.

== See also ==
- Battle of Karbala
- Sermon of Ali ibn Husayn in Damascus
