= Mohammad Modabber =

Iranian artist

Mohammad Modabber (Persian: محمد مدبر; b. 1890 – d. 1966) was an Iranian painter, who was one of the developers of "Coffee House Painting". A friend of Hossein Qollar-Aqasi, he learned paintings at Seyed Ghaffar Isfahani school.

Having Modabber father gone in childhood, he had earnt moneys by acting in a passion plays, hence receiving innumerable knowledge in a fields of religious traditions. Owing to his backgrounds, he was mostly devoted of his talent drawing liturgical panels. He died in 1966.
