= Tawwabin uprising =

680–685 Islamic movement

The Tawwabin uprising (Arabic: ثَوْرَة ٱلتَّوَّابِين, Thawrah at-Tawwābīn), or the Penitents' uprising, refers to the movement of the Kufan pro-Alids to avenge the death of Husayn ibn Ali, whom they had invited to Kufa, at the Battle of Karbala in 680 CE (60 AH). The group was led by Sulayman ibn Surad. The Tawwabin fought against the Umayyad army at the Battle of Ayn al-Warda in January 685, where the Tawwabin were defeated and their leaders were killed.

== Background and formation of the Tawwabin ==
After the ascension of the second Umayyad caliph Yazid I, the Kufans invited Husayn ibn Ali to lead a revolt against him. While on his way to Kufa, Husayn was killed at the Battle of Karbala by a Kufan army under the Umayyad governor, Ubayd Allah ibn Ziyad. The Kufans were regretful and blamed themselves for betraying Husayn. An organized movement was then started by a group of Kufans, who called themselves Tawwabin (the penitents). The uprising started under the leadership of five followers of Husayn's father, Ali ibn Abi Talib, and initially consisted of one hundred Kufans, all aged sixty years or more. They held their first meeting in the house of Sulayman ibn Surad in 61 AH (680/81 CE), in which Sulayman was elected as the leader of the uprising. The movement remained secret until 64 AH (683/84 CE). After the death of Yazid and the start of the Second Fitna, the Iraqis drove out the Umayyad governor Ubayd Allah ibn Ziyad, and Iraq came under the control of Abd Allah ibn al-Zubayr. The collapse of Umayyad authority eased conditions for the Tawwabin, and they publicly started calling for support for their cause.

The movement had no further goals apart from fighting the Umayyads and atoning for their failure to support Husayn. Their slogan was "Ya Latharat al-Husayn" (Arabic: ِیا لثارات الحسین, lit. 'Rise to avenge Husayn's blood'). Some 16,000 people enlisted in the register of Sulayman. They secretly gathered soldiers and weapons from Kufa and the tribes around it. Sulayman secured the support of leaders in Basra and al-Mada'in by sending letters.

== Start of the uprising ==
In Rabi' al-thani of 65 AH (November/December 684 CE), Sulayman summoned his men that had joined his army to Nukhayla. Out of 16,000 people that had promised to show up, only 4000 were present. One of the reasons was that Mukhtar al-Thaqafi believed that Sulayman had no experience of wars, so many Shias, especially those from Mada'in and Basra, from Khuzai's army began to abandon him in large numbers. Finally, 1000 more left the army. The army spent three days in Nukhayla, and then went to Karbala to mourn at the grave of Husayn.

== Battle of Ayn al-Warda ==
After visiting Karbala, the army arrived at Qarqisiya. The Tawwabin pressed on to Ayn al-Warda (identified with Ra's al-Ayn), where they met an Umayyad army of 20,000, under command of Husayn ibn Numayr. The battle started on 4 January 685 and lasted for three days. Although the Tawwabin held the upper hand in a first skirmish, over the next two days the numerical superiority of the Umayyad army began to prevail. Finally, Sulayman was killed and the Tawwabin were almost annihilated. Rifa bin Shaddad advised the survivors to return and brought them to Qarqisiya. The small number of Tawwabin who survived the battle, went over to Mukhtar al-Thaqafi. These Kufans, who formed the backbone of Mukhtar's movement, called themselves Shia al-Mahdi, Shia al-Haqq or Shia al-Muhammad. In his book, The origins and early development of Shia Islam, Seyed Husain Mohammad Jafari argues that the Tawwabin were apparently defeated, but in fact they formed the first ever integrated Shia organization, which was influenced by Husayn's thinking, in order to serve the Shia community.

== Sources ==
- Daftary, Farhad (1990). The Ismāʿı̄lı̄s: Their History and Doctrines (First ed.). Cambridge: Cambridge University Press. ISBN 978-0-521-37019-6.
- Hawting, G. R., ed. (1989). The History of al-Ṭabarī, Volume XX: The Collapse of Sufyānid Authority and the Coming of the Marwānids: The Caliphates of Muʿāwiyah II and Marwān I and the Beginning of the Caliphate of ʿAbd al-Malik, A.D. 683–685/A.H. 64–66. SUNY Series in Near Eastern Studies. Albany, New York: State University of New York Press. ISBN 978-0-88706-855-3.
- Jafri, S. M. (2000). The Origins and Early Development of Shi'a Islam. Oxford: Oxford University Press. ISBN 0195793870.
- Kennedy, Hugh (2001). The Armies of the Caliphs: Military and Society in the Early Islamic State. London and New York: Routledge. ISBN 0-415-25093-5.
- Sharon, Moshe (1983). Black Banners from the East: The Establishment of the ʻAbbāsid State : Incubation of a Revolt. Jerusalem: JSAI. ISBN 978-965-223-501-5.
- Wellhausen, Julius (1901). Die religiös-politischen Oppositionsparteien im alten Islam (in German). Berlin: Weidmann'sche Buchhandlung. OCLC 453206240.
