= Ibn A'tham al-Kufi =

9th century Arab Muslim historian

Abū Muḥammad Aḥmad ibn Aʿtham al-Kūfī al-Kindī (Arabic: أبو محمد أحمد بن أعثم الكوفي) was a 9th-century Arab Muslim historian (akhbārī), poet and preacher (qāṣṣ) active in the late 8th and early 9th centuries. He was a Shīʿī, a son of a student (or tradent) of the sixth Imam, Jaʿfar al-Ṣādiq, who died in 765.

Although Ibn Aʿtham al-Kūfī's date of death is usually given as AH 314 (AD 926/7), this is an error. His major work, Kitāb al-Futūḥ ("Book of Conquests"), was composed during the caliphate of al-Maʾmūn (813–833). It survives in a single two-volume manuscript, Ahmad III 2956, now in Istanbul.

The writing of the Kitāb al-Futūḥ was interrupted in AH 204 (AD 819) as a result of the Abbasid Civil War. At that time Ibn Aʿtham had brought his narrative down to the Battle of Karbalāʾ AH 61 (AD 680) using several existing monographs. A Persian translation of this version was made by Ibn al-Mustawfī in AH 596 (AD 1199/1200). Ibn Aʿtham later returned to his work, however, and extended it down to the time of Hārūn al-Rashīd (786–809). Thereafter two Sunnī writers continued the Kitāb down to the reign of al-Muqtadir (908–932). The whole compilation including the continuations was considered a work of Ibn Aʿtham by the 13th-century biographer Yāqūt, who called it Kitāb al-Taʾrīkh ("Book of History"). Yāqūt ascribes two other now lost works to Ibn Aʿtham as well.

Ibn Aʿtham names as his sources al-Madāʾinī, al-Wāḳidī, al-Zuhrī, Abū Mikhnaf and Ibn al-Kalbī, with al-Madaʾinī being the most cited. His narrative is fullest for the period from the reign of ʿUthmān down to that of Hārūn, particularly for events in Iraq. He is a major source for the conquest of Khorasan, the conquest of Armenia, the conquest of Azerbaijan, the Arab–Khazar wars and the Arab–Byzantine wars. He provides less detail about the conquests themselves than does al-Balādhurī, but he is more detailed in his description of the internal situation in the conquered lands.

Although he provides a useful narrative, his chief value is as a source of information about what texts were circulating in early 9th-century Iraq. He often acts as an early eyewitness to texts later used by more serious and formal historians (such as al-Ṭabarī) from the 10th century on, thereby indirectly providing information about how later historians made use of those sources. He himself did not do original research, but compiled and collated from circulating histories.

== Sources ==
- Conrad, L. I. (1998). "Ibn Aʿtham al-Kūfī". In J. S. Meisami; P. Starkey (eds.). Encyclopedia of Arabic Literature. Vol. 1. Routledge. p. 314.
- Conrad, L. I. (2015). "Ibn Aʿt̲h̲am and His History" (PDF). Al-ʿUṣūr al-Wusṭā. 23: 87–125. Archived from the original (PDF) on 2019-01-13.
- Daniel, E. (2012). "Ketāb al-Fotūḥ". Encyclopaedia Iranica Online.
- Lindstedt, Ilkka (2017). "Sources for the Biography of the Historian Ibn Aʿtham al-Kūfī". In J. Hämeen-Anttila; P. Koskikallio; I. Lindstedt (eds.). Contacts and Interaction: Proceedings of the 27th Congress of the Union Européenne des Arabisants et Islamisants, Helsinki 2014. Leuven: Peeters. pp. 299–309.
- Schönléber, Monika (2017). "Notes on the Textual Tradition of Ibn Aʿtham's Kitāb al-Futūḥ". In J. Hämeen-Anttila; P. Koskikallio; I. Lindstedt (eds.). Contacts and Interaction: Proceedings of the 27th Congress of the Union Européenne des Arabisants et Islamisants, Helsinki 2014. Leuven: Peeters. pp. 427–438.
- Shaban, M. A. (1971). "Ibn Aʿt̲h̲am al-Kūfī". In Lewis, B.; Ménage, V. L.; Pellat, Ch. & Schacht, J. (eds.). The Encyclopaedia of Islam, Second Edition. Volume III: H–Iram. Leiden: E. J. Brill. p. 723. OCLC 495469525.
