= Battle of Karbala =

680 battle in Iraq

- Part of the Second Fitna
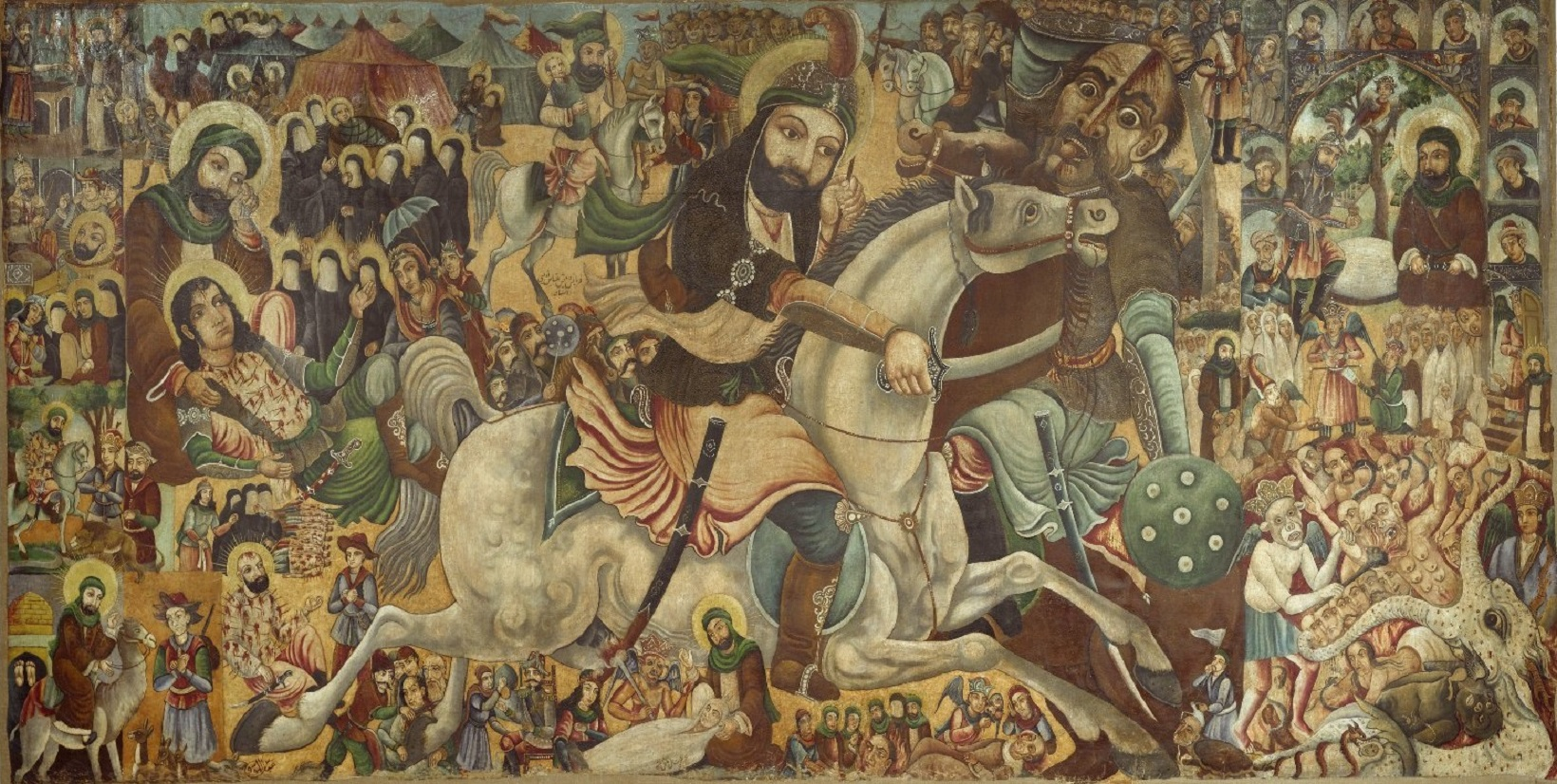
- Abbas Al-Musavi's Battle of Karbala painting, 1868–1933, Qajar Iran, housed at Brooklyn Museum
Date	10 October 680 CE (10 Muharram 61 AH)
Location	Karbala, Iraq 32°36′55″N 44°01′53″E
Result	Umayyad victory

Belligerents
Umayyad Caliphate	Alids

Commanders and leaders
Ubayd Allah ibn Ziyad; Umar ibn Sa'd; Shimr ibn Dhi al-Jawshan	Husayn ibn Ali †; Abbas ibn Ali †; Habib ibn Muzahir †; Zuhayr ibn al-Qayn †

Strength
4,000–30,000 (Note: The Shi'a sources assert that the army was 30,000 strong.)	72–145

Casualties and losses
100+ killed	72+ killed
- Location within Iraq

The Battle of Karbala (Arabic: مَعْرَكَة كَرْبَلَاء, romanized: Maʿrakat Karbalāʾ) was fought on 10 October 680 (10 Muharram in the year 61 AH of the Islamic calendar) between the forces of the second Umayyad caliph Yazid I (r. 680–683), and a small army led by Husayn ibn Ali, second son of Ali and grandson of the Islamic prophet Muhammad, at Karbala, in modern-day southern Iraq.

Prior to his death, the Umayyad caliph Mu'awiya I (r. 661–680) appointed his son Yazid as his successor, making the caliphate hereditary. Yazid's nomination was contested by Husayn and other notables, and after Mu'awiya died in 680, Yazid demanded allegiance from Husayn and the other dissidents. Husayn refused and took refuge in Mecca. While Husayn was in Mecca, the residents of Kufa, the center of Ali's caliphate, sent him numerous letters inviting him to overthrow Umayyad rule, and pledging their allegiance to him. Husayn first sent his cousin, Muslim ibn Aqil, to Kufa to assess the situation and the genuineness of their support. After receiving a favorable report from Muslim, Husayn accepted their invitation and traveled toward the city in response to their calls.

On his way to Kufa with about 72 men, Husayn's caravan was intercepted by a 1,000-strong army of the caliph at some distance from Kufa. He was forced to head north and encamp at the plains of Karbala on 2 October, where another 4,000-strong Umayyad army arrived soon afterwards. Negotiations failed after the Umayyad governor Ubayd Allah ibn Ziyad refused to grant Husayn safe passage unless he submitted to his authority, a condition Husayn rejected. The battle ensued on 10 October, during which Husayn was killed along with most of his family members and close companions, while the surviving members of his family were taken captive and brought first to Kufa and then to Damascus. This sparked the Second Fitna, during which the people of Kufa organized two campaigns to avenge the killing of Husayn; first by the Tawwabin, and the second by Mukhtar al-Thaqafi, who ruled over much of Iraq and parts of northwestern Iran for eighteen months and killed several figures responsible for Husayn's death.

The Battle of Karbala gave the early political party of pro-Alids, which had not yet developed specific theological doctrines and set of rituals, a distinct religious identity and helped transform and consolidate it into a separate religious sect. Heinz Halm writes: "There was no religious aspect to Shi'ism prior to 680. The death of the third imam and his followers marked the 'big bang' that created the rapidly expanding cosmos of Shi'ism and brought it into motion."

== Background ==
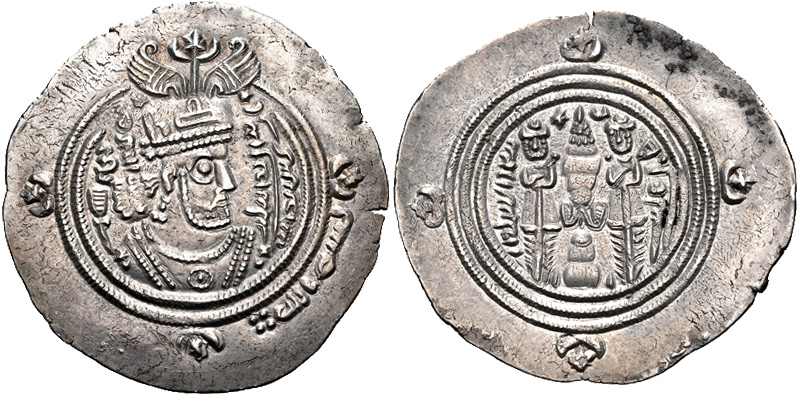
Coin issued by Yazid I following Sasanian motifs, struck at the Basra mint, dated AH 61 (AD 680/1), the year in which the Battle of Karbala occurred

After the assassination of the third caliph Uthman ibn Affan by rebels in 656, Ali ibn Abi Talib, a cousin and son-in-law of the Islamic prophet Muhammad, was proclaimed as the fourth caliph in Medina. Ali's legitimacy as caliph was denounced by Uthman's kinsman Mu'awiya ibn Abi Sufyan, the long-time governor of Syria. When Ali was assassinated in 661, his eldest son Hasan succeeded him but soon signed a peace treaty that handed over power to Mu'awiya on the condition that Mu'awiya be a just ruler and that he would allow his successor to be chosen through shura (consultation). (Note: Several conflicting terms of the treaty have been reported. Most of the accounts mention various financial rewards to Hasan. Other conditions, different in different sources, include selection of new caliph through shura (consultation) after Mu'awiya's death, transfer of the caliphate to Hasan after Mu'awiya's death, general amnesty to Hasan's followers, rule according to Qur'an and the Sunna of Muhammad, discontinuation of cursing of Ali from the pulpit, financial rewards to Husayn, and preferential treatment of the Hashemite clan (clan of Muhammad). According to Vaglieri, conditions other than financial benefits are suspect and were probably invented later in order to mitigate criticism of Hasan for having abdicated. Jafri, on the other hand, considers the terms in addition to financial compensation reliable.) After the death of Hasan in 670, his younger brother Husayn became the head of the Banu Hashim clan to which Ali and Muhammad had belonged. Though his father's supporters in Kufa gave him their allegiance, he would abide by the peace treaty between Hasan and Mu'awiya as long as the latter was alive.

In 676, Mu'awiya nominated his son Yazid as successor, a move that has been labelled as a breach of the peace treaty. With no precedence in Islamic history, hereditary succession aroused opposition from several quarters. Mu'awiya summoned a shura (consultative assembly), in Damascus and persuaded representatives from many provinces to agree to his plan by diplomacy. He then ordered Marwan ibn al-Hakam, then the governor of Medina, where several influential Muslims resided, to announce the decision. Marwan faced resistance to this announcement, especially from Husayn, Abd Allah ibn al-Zubayr, Abd Allah ibn Umar and Abd al-Rahman ibn Abi Bakr, all of whom were sons of Muhammad's prominent companions, and could also lay claim to the caliphate by virtue of their descent. Mu'awiya went to Medina and pressed them to accede, but they still refused to support him. On his return to Damascus, Mu'awiya nonetheless convinced the people of Mecca and Medina that they had pledged allegiance, and received their allegiance for Yazid as well. There was no further overt protest against the plan for Yazid's succession. According to the historians Fitzpatrick and Walker, Yazid's succession, which was considered as an "anomaly in Islamic history", transformed the government from a "consultative" form to a monarchy. Before his death in April 680, Mu'awiya cautioned Yazid that Husayn and Ibn al-Zubayr might challenge his rule and instructed him to defeat them if they did. Yazid was further advised to treat Husayn with caution and not to spill his blood, since he was the grandson of Muhammad.

== Prelude ==
On his succession, Yazid tasked the governor of Medina, al-Walid ibn Utba ibn Abi Sufyan, to secure allegiance from Husayn and Ibn al-Zubayr, with force if necessary. Al-Walid sought the advice of his Umayyad relative Marwan ibn al-Hakam, who suggested that Ibn al-Zubayr and Husayn should be compelled to pledge allegiance as they were dangerous, while Ibn Umar should be left alone since he posed no threat. Al-Walid summoned the two, but Ibn al-Zubayr escaped to Mecca. Husayn answered the summons but declined to pledge allegiance in the secretive environment of the meeting, suggesting it should be done in public. Marwan told Walid to imprison or execute him, but due to Husayn's kinship with Muhammad, al-Walid was unwilling to take any action against him. A few days later, Husayn left for Mecca without acknowledging Yazid. He arrived in Mecca at the beginning of May 680, and stayed there until the beginning of September.

Husayn had considerable support in Kufa, which had been the capital of the caliphate during the reigns of his father and brother. The Kufans had fought the Umayyads and their Syrian Arab tribal allies during the First Fitna. They were dissatisfied with Hasan's abdication and strongly resented Umayyad rule. While in Mecca, Husayn received letters from pro-Alids in Kufa asking him to lead them in revolt against Yazid, promising to remove the Umayyad governor if Husayn would consent to aid them. Husayn wrote back affirmatively and promised to lead them with right guidance. Then he sent his cousin Muslim ibn Aqil to assess the situation in Kufa. Ibn Aqil attracted widespread support and informed Husayn of the situation, suggesting that he join them there. Yazid removed Nu'man ibn Bashir as governor of Kufa due to his inaction, and installed Ubayd Allah ibn Ziyad, then governor of Basra, in his place. As a result of Ibn Ziyad's political maneuvering, Ibn Aqil's following began to dissipate, and he was forced to declare the revolt prematurely. It was crushed and Ibn Aqil was killed. Husayn had also sent a messenger to Basra, another garrison town in Iraq, but the messenger could not attract any following and was quickly apprehended and executed.

Husayn was unaware of the change of political circumstances in Kufa and decided to depart. Abd Allah ibn Abbas and Abd Allah ibn al-Zubayr advised him not to move to Iraq, or if he was determined, not to take women and children with him. Ibn al-Zubayr offered to support Husayn if he stayed in Mecca and led the opposition to Yazid from there. Husayn refused, citing his abhorrence of bloodshed in the sanctuary, and decided to proceed with his plan.

== Journey towards Kufa ==
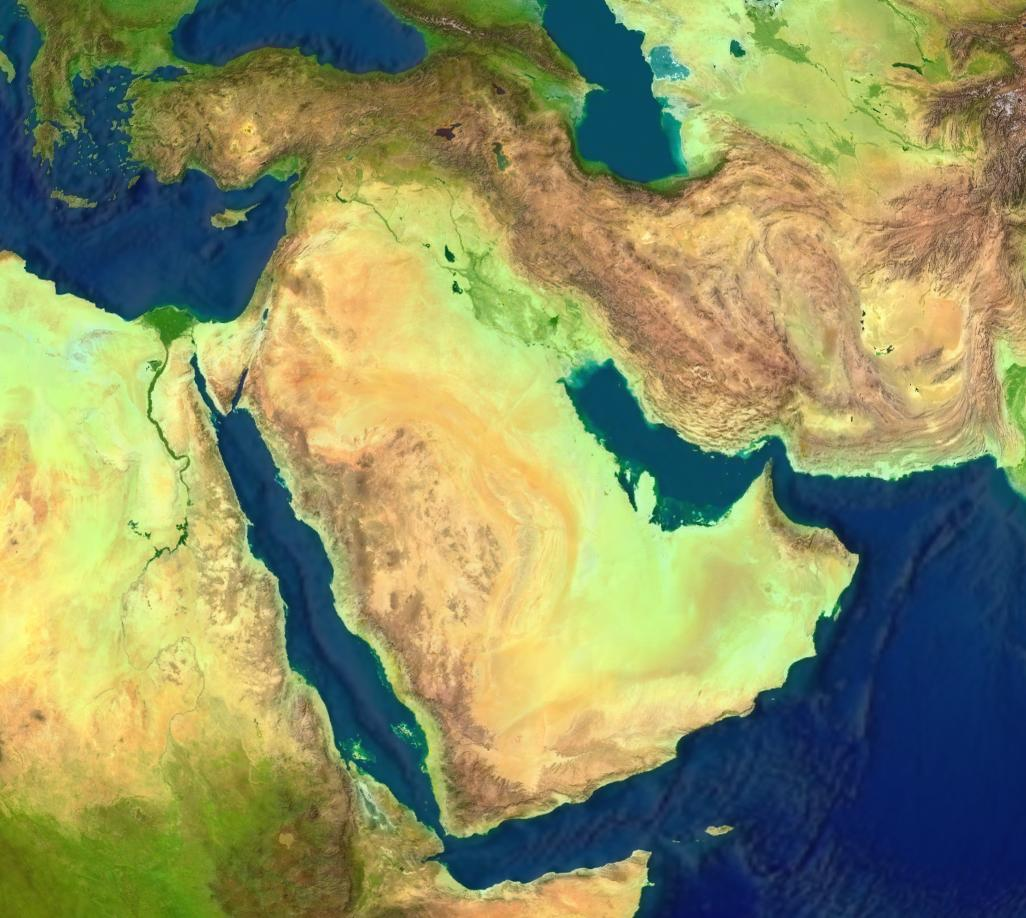
Husayn traveled from Mecca to Kufa through the Arabian Desert.

Husayn left Mecca with a group of fifty men and his family on 9 September 680 (8 Dhu al-Hijjah 60 AH), a day before the Hajj pilgrimage. He took the northerly route through the Arabian Desert. At the urging of Husayn's cousin Abd Allah ibn Ja'far, the governor of Mecca, Amr ibn Sa'id al-Ashdaq, sent his brother and Ibn Ja'far after Husayn to assure him of his safety in Mecca and persuade him to return. Husayn refused to return, relating that Muhammad had ordered him in a dream to move forward irrespective of the consequences. At a place known as Tan'im, he seized a caravan carrying dyeing plants and clothes sent to Yazid by the governor of Yemen. Further on the way, at a place called Tha'labiyya, the small caravan received the news of the execution of Ibn Aqil. At this point, Husayn reportedly considered turning back, but was supposedly persuaded to push forward by Ibn Aqil's brothers, who wanted to avenge his death. Later, at Zubala, Husayn learned of the capture and execution of his messenger Qays ibn Musahir al-Saydawi, whom he had sent from the Hejaz (western Arabia) to Kufa to announce his arrival. (Note: According to other accounts, the person was Husayn's foster brother Abd Allah ibn Yaqtur whom he had sent after learning of Ibn Aqil's execution.) He informed his followers of the situation and asked them to leave. Most of the people who had joined him on the way left, while his companions from Mecca decided to stay with him.

Ibn Ziyad had stationed troops on the routes into Kufa. Husayn and his followers were intercepted by the vanguard of Yazid's Kufan army, about 1,000 men led by al-Hurr ibn Yazid al-Tamimi, south of Kufa near al-Qadisiyyah. Husayn said to them:

I did not come to you until your letters were brought to me, and your messengers came to me saying, "Come to us, for we have no Imām. God may unite us in the truth through you." Since this was your view, I have come to you. Therefore, if you give me what you guaranteed in your covenants and sworn testimonies, I will come to your town. If you will not and are averse to my coming, I will leave you for the place from which I came to you.

He then showed them the letters he had received from the Kufans. Al-Hurr denied any knowledge of the letters and stated that Husayn must go with him to Ibn Ziyad, which Husayn refused to do. Al-Hurr responded that he would not allow Husayn to either enter Kufa or go back to Medina, but that he was free to travel anywhere else he wished. Nevertheless, he did not prevent four Kufans from joining Husayn. Husayn's caravan started to move towards Qadisiyyah, and al-Hurr followed them. At Naynawa, Al-Hurr received orders from Ibn Ziyad to force Husayn's caravan to halt in a desolate place without fortifications or water. One of Husayn's companions suggested that they attack al-Hurr and move to the fortified village of al-Aqr. Husayn refused, stating that he did not want to start the hostilities. On 2 October 680 (2 Muharram 61 AH), Husayn arrived at Karbala, a desert plain 70 kilometers (43 mi) north of Kufa, and set up camp.

On the following day, another 4,000-strong Kufan army arrived under the command of Umar ibn Sa'd, the governor of Ray. He had been tasked to suppress a local rebellion, but was then recalled to subdue Husayn. Initially, he was unwilling to fight Husayn, but complied following Ibn Ziyad's threat to revoke his governorship. After negotiations with Husayn, Ibn Sa'd wrote to Ibn Ziyad that Husayn was willing to return. Ibn Ziyad replied that Husayn must surrender or he should be subdued by force, and that to compel him, he and his companions should be denied access to the Euphrates river. Ibn Sa'd stationed 500 horsemen on the route leading to the river. Husayn and his companions remained without water for three days before a group of fifty men led by his half-brother Abbas was able to access the river. They could only fill twenty water-skins.

Husayn and Ibn Sa'd met during the night to negotiate a settlement; it was rumored that Husayn made three proposals: either he be allowed to return to Medina, submit to Yazid directly, or be sent to a border post where he would fight alongside the Muslim armies. According to Madelung, these reports are probably untrue as Husayn at this stage is unlikely to have considered submitting to Yazid. A mawla of Husayn's wife later claimed that Husayn had suggested that he be allowed to leave, so that all parties could allow the fluid political situation to clarify. Ibn Sa'd sent the proposal, whatever it was, to Ibn Ziyad, who is reported to have accepted but then persuaded otherwise by Shimr ibn Dhi al-Jawshan. Shimr argued that Husayn was in his domain and letting him go would be to demonstrate weakness. Ibn Ziyad then sent Shimr with orders to ask Husayn for his allegiance once more and to attack him if he was to refuse, as he was to do no further harm after his death. If Ibn Sa'd was unwilling to carry out the attack, he was instructed to hand over command to Shimr. Ibn Sa'd cursed Shimr and accused him of foiling his attempts to reach a peaceful settlement but agreed to carry out the orders. He remarked that Husayn would not submit because there was "a proud soul in him".

The Kufan troops advanced toward Husayn's camp on the evening of 9 October. Husayn sent Abbas to ask Ibn Sa'd to wait until the next morning, so that they could consider the matter. Ibn Sa'd agreed to this respite. Husayn told his men that they were all free to leave, with his family, under the cover of night, since their opponents only wanted him. Very few availed themselves of the opportunity. Defense arrangements were made: tents were brought together and tied to one another and a ditch was dug behind the tents and filled with wood ready to be set alight in case of attack. Husayn and his followers then spent the rest of the night praying.

== Battle ==
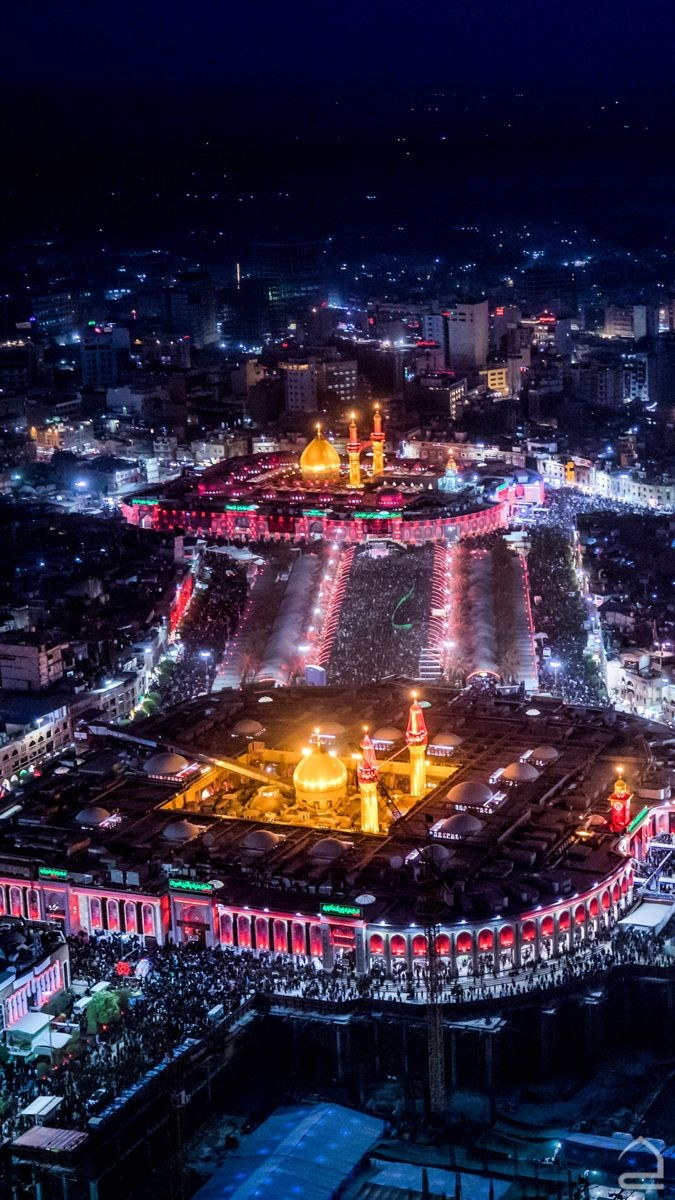
Imam Husayn and Al-Abbas Shrines in Karbala, Iraq, where Husayn and Abbas are buried. They are two profoundly holy sites in Shia Islam, visited by millions annually.

After the morning prayer on 10 October, both parties took up battle positions. Husayn appointed Zuhayr ibn al-Qayn to command the right flank of his army, Habib ibn Muzahir to command the left flank, and his half-brother Abbas as the standard bearer. Husayn's companions, according to most accounts, numbered thirty-two horsemen and forty infantrymen; although forty-five horsemen and one hundred foot-soldiers, or a total of a few hundred men have been reported by some sources. Ibn Sa'd's army totaled 4,000. According to the Shi'a sources, however, more troops had joined Ibn Sa'd in preceding days, swelling his army to 30,000 strong. The ditch containing wood was set alight. Husayn then delivered a speech to his opponents reminding them of his status as Muhammad's grandson and reproaching them for inviting and then abandoning him. He asked to be allowed to leave. He was told that first he had to submit to Yazid's authority, which he refused to do. Husayn's speech moved al-Hurr ibn Yazid al-Tamimi to defect to his side.

After Husayn's speech, Zuhayr ibn al-Qayn attempted to dissuade Ibn Sa'd's soldiers from killing Husayn, but in vain. Ibn Sa'd's army fired several volleys of arrows. This was followed by duels in which several of Husayn's companions were slain. The right wing of the Kufans, led by Amr ibn al-Hajjaj, attacked Husayn's force, but was repulsed. Hand-to-hand fighting paused and further volleys of arrows were exchanged. Shimr, who commanded the left wing of the Umayyad army, launched an attack, but after losses on both sides he was repulsed. This was followed by cavalry attacks. Husayn's cavalry resisted fiercely and Ibn Sa'd brought in armoured cavalry and five hundred archers. After their horses were wounded by arrows, Husayn's cavalrymen dismounted and fought on foot.

Since the Kufans could approach Husayn's army from the front only, Ibn Sa'd ordered all of the tents, except the one which Husayn and his family were using, to be burned. The plan backfired and the flames hindered the Umayyad advance for a while. After noon prayers, Husayn's companions were encircled, and almost all of them were killed. Husayn's relatives, who had not taken part in the fighting so far, joined the battle. Husayn's son Ali al-Akbar was killed; then Husayn's half-brothers, including Abbas, and the sons of Aqil ibn Abi Talib, Ja'far ibn Abi Talib and Hasan ibn Ali were slain. The account of Abbas' death is not given in the primary sources, al-Tabari and al-Baladhuri, but a prominent Shi'a theologian Shaykh al-Mufid states in his account in Kitab al-Irshad that Abbas went to the river together with Husayn but became separated, was surrounded, and killed. At some point, a young child of Husayn's, who was sitting on his lap, was hit by an arrow and died.

=== Death of Husayn ===
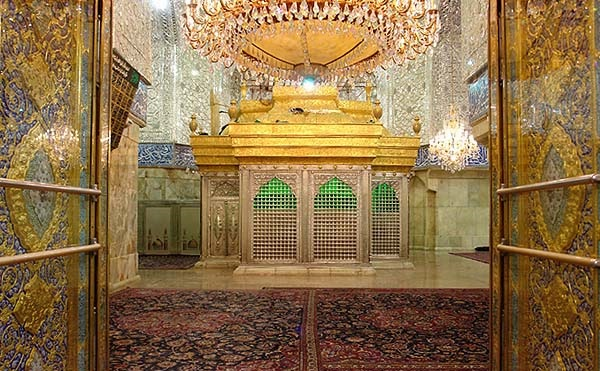
The zarih over Husayn's grave.

The Umayyad soldiers hesitated to attack Husayn directly, but he was struck in the mouth by an arrow as he went to the river to drink. He collected his blood in a cupped hand and cast towards the sky, complaining to God of his suffering. Later, he was surrounded and struck on the head by Malik ibn Nusayr. The blow cut through his hooded cloak, which Husayn removed while cursing his attacker. He put a cap on his head and wrapped a turban around it to staunch the bleeding. Ibn Nusayr seized the bloodied cloak and retreated.

Shimr advanced towards Husayn with a group of foot soldiers, who was now prepared to fight as few people were left on his side. A young boy from Husayn's camp tried to defend him from a sword stroke and had his arm cut off. Ibn Sa'd approached the tents, and Husayn's sister Zaynab complained to him: "'Umar b. Sa'd, will Abu 'Abd Allah (the kunya of Husayn) be killed while you stand and watch?" Ibn Sa'd wept but did nothing. Husayn is said to have killed many of his attackers, but they were still unwilling to kill him. Eventually Shimr shouted: "Shame on you! Why are you waiting for the man? Kill him, may your mothers be deprived of you!" The Kufan soldiers then rushed at Husayn and wounded him on his hand and shoulder. He fell on the ground face-down and was then stabbed and decapitated by Sinan ibn Anas.

== Aftermath ==
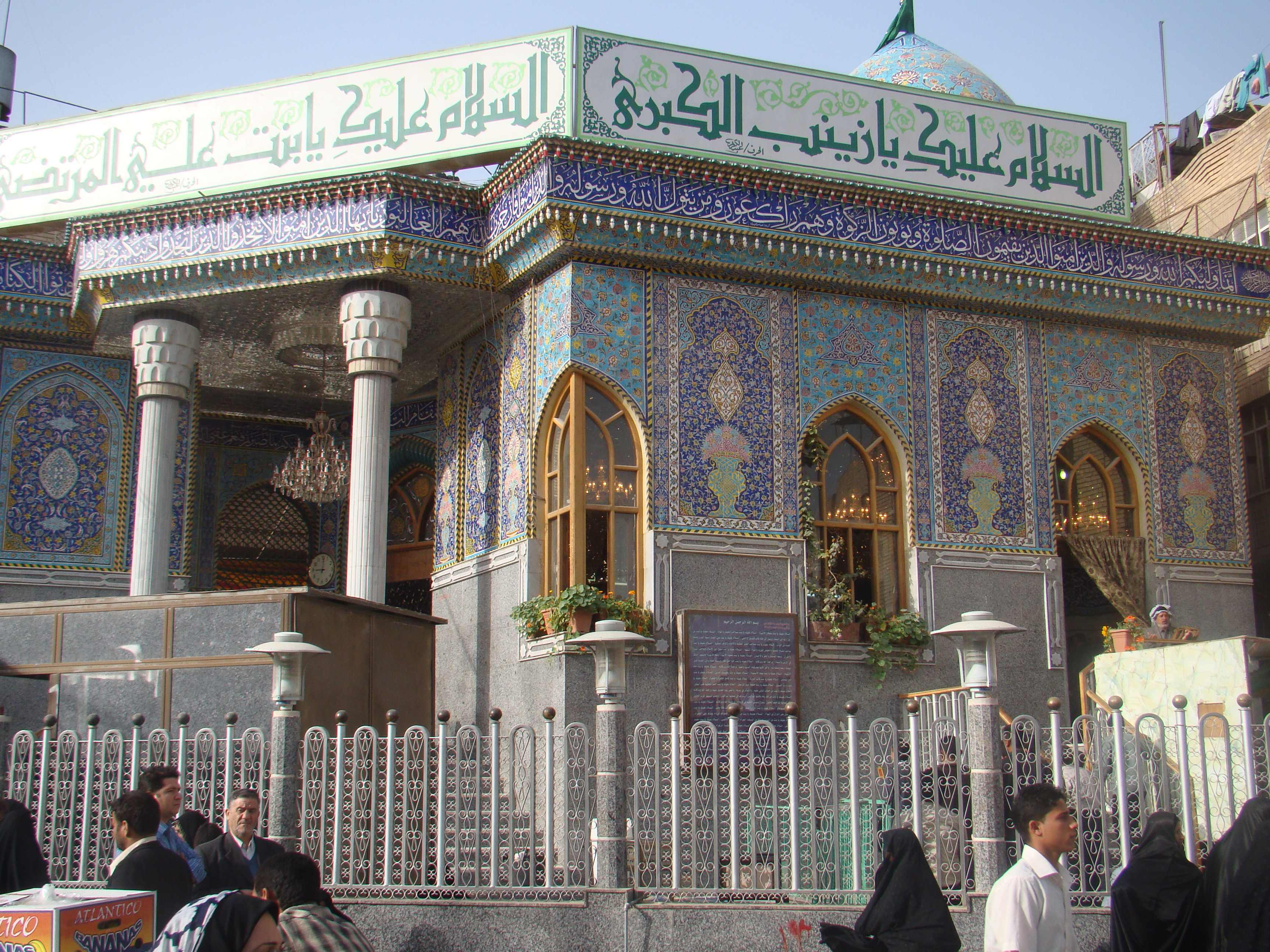
Tel Zaynabiyah, the place from which Zaynab, Husayn's sister, viewed the battle.

Seventy or seventy-two people died on Husayn's side, of whom about twenty were descendants of Abu Talib, the father of Ali. This included two of Husayn's sons, six of his paternal brothers, three sons of Hasan ibn Ali, three sons of Jafar ibn Abi Talib, and three sons and three grandsons of Aqil ibn Abi Talib. Following the battle, Husayn's clothes were stripped, and his sword, shoes and baggage were taken. The women's jewelry and cloaks were also seized. Shimr wanted to execute Husayn's only surviving son Ali Zayn al-Abidin, who had not taken part in the fighting because of illness, but was prevented by Ibn Sa'd. There are reports of more than sixty wounds on Husayn's body, which was then trampled with horses as previously instructed by Ibn Ziyad. The bodies of Husayn's companions were decapitated. There were eighty-eight dead in Ibn Sa'd's army, who were buried before he left. After his departure, members of the Banu Asad tribe, from the nearby village of Ghadiriya, buried the headless bodies of Husayn's companions.

Husayn's family, along with the heads of the dead, were sent to Ibn Ziyad. He poked Husayn's mouth with a stick and intended to execute Ali Zayn al-Abidin, but spared him after the pleas of Husayn's sister Zaynab. The heads and the family were then sent to Yazid, who also poked Husayn's mouth with a stick. The historian Henri Lammens has suggested that this is a duplication of the report regarding Ibn Ziyad. Yazid was compassionate towards the women and Ali Zayn al-Abidin, and cursed Ibn Ziyad for murdering Husayn, stating that had he been there, he would have spared him. One of his courtiers asked for the hand of a captive woman from Husayn's family in marriage, which resulted in heated altercation between Yazid and Zaynab. The women of Yazid's household joined the captive women in their lamentation for the dead. After a few days, the women were compensated for their belongings looted in Karbala and were sent back to Medina.

=== Tawwabin uprising ===
In Kufa, prominent Alid partisans felt guilty for abandoning Husayn after having invited him to revolt. To atone for their perceived sins, they initiated the Tawwabin movement, under Sulayman ibn Surad. While Iraq was under Umayyad rule, the movement remained underground, but after the death of Yazid in November 683, the people of Iraq drove out the Umayyad governor Ibn Ziyad. Lacking any political program, the Tawwabin attracted large-scale support with their calls to punish the Umayyads, or sacrifice themselves in the struggle. Their slogan was "Revenge for Husayn". Mukhtar al-Thaqafi, another prominent pro-Alid leader in Kufa, attempted to dissuade the Tawwabin from this endeavor in favor of an organized movement but Ibn Surad's stature, as a companion of Muhammad and an old ally of Ali, prevented most of his followers from accepting Mukhtar's proposal. Although 16,000 men enlisted to fight, only 4,000 assembled. In November 684, the Tawwabin left to confront the Umayyads, after mourning for a day at Husayn's grave in Karbala. At the Battle of Ayn al-Warda in January 685, most of the Tawwabin, including Ibn Surad, were killed. A few escaped to Kufa and joined Mukhtar.

=== Revolt of Mukhtar al-Thaqafi ===
Mukhtar was an early settler of Kufa, having arrived in Iraq following its initial conquest by the Muslims. He had participated in the failed rebellion of Muslim ibn Aqil, for which he was imprisoned by Ibn Ziyad, before being released after the intervention of Abd Allah ibn Umar. Mukhtar then went to Mecca and had a short-lived alliance with Abd Allah ibn al-Zubayr, who had established himself in Mecca in opposition to Yazid. After Yazid's death, he returned to Kufa where he advocated for revenge against Husayn's killers and the establishment of an Alid caliphate in the name of Husayn's half-brother Muhammad ibn al-Hanafiyya, and declared himself as Ibn al-Hanafiyya's representative.

The defeat of the Tawwabin left the leadership of the Kufan pro-Alids in his hands. In October 685, Mukhtar and his supporters, a significant of number of whom consisted of local converts (mawali), overthrew Ibn al-Zubayr's governor, Abd Allah ibn Muti, and seized control of Kufa. His attitude towards the mawali, whom he awarded many favors and equal status to Arabs, provoked a rebellion by the dissatisfied Arab aristocracy. After crushing the rebellion, Mukhtar executed the Kufans involved in Husayn's death, including Ibn Sa'd and Shimr, while thousands of people fled to Basra. He then sent his general Ibrahim ibn al-Ashtar to fight an approaching Umayyad army, led by Ibn Ziyad, which had been sent to reconquer the province. The Umayyad army was routed at the Battle of Khazir in August 686 and Ibn Ziyad was slain.

Meanwhile, Mukhtar's relations with Abd Allah ibn al-Zubayr worsened and the Kufan refugees persuaded Mus'ab ibn al-Zubayr, the governor of Basra and younger brother of Ibn al-Zubayr, to retake control of Kufa. After being defeated by Mus'ab in open battle, Mukhtar and his remaining supporters were besieged in the palace of Kufa. Four months later, Mukhtar was killed in April 687 while some 6,000–8,000 of his supporters were executed. According to Mohsen Zakeri, Mukhtar's attitude towards the mawali was one of the reasons behind his failure, as Kufa was not ready for such "revolutionary measures". Mukhtar's supporters survived the collapse of his revolution and evolved into a sect known as the Kaysanites. The Hashimiyya, a splinter group of the Kaysanites, was later taken over by the Abbasids and eventually overthrew the Umayyads in 750.

== Primary and classic sources ==
The primary source of the Karbala narrative is the work of the Kufan historian Abu Mikhnaf titled Kitab Maqtal Al-Husayn. Other early monographs on the death of Husayn, which have not survived, were written by al-Asbagh ibn Nubata, Jabir ibn Yazid al-Ju'fi, Ammar ibn Mu'awiya al-Duhni, Awana ibn al-Hakam, al-Waqidi, Hisham ibn al-Kalbi, Nasr ibn Muzahim, and al-Mada'ini; of these al-Asbagh's monograph was perhaps the earliest. Although Abu Mikhnaf's date of birth is unknown, he was an adult by the time of the revolt of Ibn al-Ash'ath, which occurred in 701, some twenty years after the Battle of Karbala. As such he knew many eyewitnesses and collected firsthand accounts and some with very short chains of transmission, usually only one or two intermediaries. The eyewitnesses were of two kinds: those from Husayn's side; and those from Ibn Sa'd's army. Since few people from Husayn's camp survived, most eyewitnesses were from the second category. According to Julius Wellhausen, most of them regretted their actions in the battle and embellished the accounts of the battle in favor of Husayn in order to dilute their guilt. Although as an Iraqi, Abu Mikhnaf had pro-Alid tendencies, his reports generally do not contain much bias on his part.

Abu Mikhnaf's original text seems to have been lost and the version extant today has been transmitted through secondary sources such as the History of Prophets and Kings, also known as The History of Tabari, by Muḥammad ibn Jarir al-Tabari; and Ansab al-Ashraf by Ahmad ibn Yaḥya al-Baladhuri. Nevertheless, four manuscripts of a Maqtal located at Gotha (No. 1836), Berlin (Sprenger, Nos. 159–160), Leiden (No. 792), and Saint Petersburg (Am No. 78) libraries have been attributed to Abu Mikhnaf. Tabari quotes either directly from Abu Mikhnaf or from his student Ibn al-Kalbi, who took most of his material from Abu Mikhnaf. Tabari occasionally takes material from Ammar ibn Mu'awiya, Awana and other primary sources, which, however, adds little to the narrative. al-Baladhuri uses same sources as al-Tabari. Information on the battle found in the works of Dinawari and al-Ya'qubi is also based on Abu Mikhnaf's Maqtal, although they occasionally provide some extra notes and verses. Other secondary sources include al-Mas'udi's Muruj al-Dhahab, Ibn Ath'am's Kitab al-Futuh, Shaykh al-Mufid's Kitab al-Irshad, and Abu al-Faraj al-Isfahani's Maqatil al-Talibiyyin. Most of these sources took material from Abu Mikhnaf, in addition to some from the primary works of Awana, al-Mada'ini and Nasr ibn Muzahim. Although Tabari and other early sources contain some miraculous stories, these sources are mainly historical and rational in nature, in contrast to the literature of later periods, which is mainly hagiographical in nature.

The Battle of Karbala was also reported by an early Christian source. A history by the Syriac Christian scholar Theophilus of Edessa, who was chief astrologer in the Abbasid court between 775 and 785, is partially preserved in a number of extant Christian chronicles, including those by Michael the Syrian and the Byzantine historian Theophanes the Confessor. Theophilus's history corroborates the death in battle of Husayn and most of his men at Karbala after suffering from thirst. But in contrast to Muslim sources, which allstate that Husayn fought Yazid, Theophilus appears to have written that Husayn was killed by Mu'awiya as the final engagement of the First Fitna.

== Historical analysis ==
Based on an official report sent to caliph Yazid, which describes the battle very briefly, stating that it lasted for no longer than a siesta, Lammens concludes that there was no battle at all but a quick massacre that was over in an hour; he suggests that the detailed accounts found in the primary sources are Iraqi fabrications, since their writers were dissatisfied with their hero being killed without putting up a fight. This is countered by the historian Laura Veccia Vaglieri, who argues that despite there being some fabricated accounts, all of the contemporary accounts together form "a coherent and credible narrative". She criticizes Lammens' hypothesis as being based on a single isolated report and being devoid of critical analysis. Similarly, Madelung and Wellhausen assert that the battle lasted from sunrise to sunset and that the overall account of the battle is reliable. Vaglieri and Madelung explain the length of the battle despite the numerical disparity between the opposing camps as Ibn Sa'd's attempt to prolong the fight and pressure Husayn into submission instead of attempting to quickly overwhelm and kill him.

According to Wellhausen, the compassion that Yazid showed to the family of Husayn, and his cursing of Ibn Ziyad was only for show. He argues that if killing Husayn was a crime its responsibility lay with Yazid and not Ibn Ziyad, who was only performing his duty. Madelung holds a similar view; according to him, early accounts place the responsibility for Husayn's death on Ibn Ziyad instead of Yazid. Yazid, Madelung argues, wanted to end Husayn's opposition, but as a caliph of Islam could not afford to be seen as publicly responsible and so diverted blame onto Ibn Ziyad by hypocritically cursing him. According to Howard, some traditional sources have a tendency to exonerate Yazid at the cost of Ibn Ziyad and lower authorities.

=== Modern historical views on Husayn's motivations ===
Wellhausen has described Husayn's revolt as a premature and ill-prepared campaign by an ambitious person. He writes "He reaches out to the moon like a child. He makes the greatest demands and does not do the slightest; the others should do everything... As soon as he encounters resistance, it is over with him; he wants to go back when it is too late." Lammens has agreed to this view and he sees in Husayn a person who disturbs public peace. According to Heinz Halm, this was a struggle for political leadership between the second generation of Muslims, in which the poorly equipped pretender ended up losing. Fred Donner, G. R. Hawting, and Hugh N. Kennedy see Husayn's revolt as an attempt to regain what his brother Hasan had renounced.

Vaglieri, on the other hand, considers him to be motivated by ideology, saying that if the materials that have come down to us are authentic, they convey an image of person who is "convinced that he was in the right, stubbornly determined to achieve his ends..." Holding a similar view, Madelung has argued that Husayn was not a "reckless rebel" but a religious man motivated by pious convictions. According to him, Husayn was convinced that "the family of the Prophet was divinely chosen to lead the community founded by Moḥammad, as the latter had been chosen, and had both an inalienable right and an obligation to seek this leadership." He was, however, not seeking martyrdom and wanted to return when his expected support did not materialize. Maria Dakake holds that Husayn considered the Umayyad rule oppressive and misguided, and revolted to reorient the Islamic community in the right direction. A similar view is held by Mahmoud Ayoub. S. M. Jafri proposes that Husayn, although motivated by ideology, did not intend to secure leadership for himself. Husayn, Jafri asserts, was from the start aiming for martyrdom in order to jolt the collective conscience of the Muslim community and reveal what he considered to be the oppressive and anti-Islamic nature of the Umayyad regime. M. Momen sides with Jafri, citing the reports that Husayn was warned about the collapse of the Shia revolt in Kufa. Instead of changing his course, however, he pressed on toward Kufa, urging his supporters to leave him and save their lives.

== Impact in Shia Islam ==
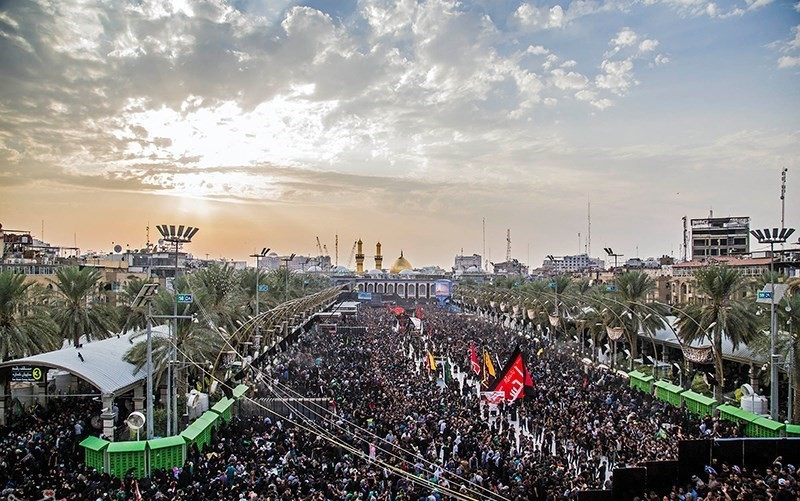
Arba'in pilgrims near the Imam Husayn Shrine, the largest annual public gathering on earth.

The Battle of Karbala holds a central place in Shia history, tradition, and theology, and has frequently been recounted in Islamic literature. His martyrdom is commemorated during the annual ten-day mourning period of Muharram by Shi'as, culminating on the tenth day of Ashura, the day when Husayn was killed. Every year on this day, over 35 million people in Karbala alone commemorate Husayn's death by holding large public processions, organising religious gatherings, beating their chests, and self-flagellating in some cases. The Imam Husayn Shrine at Karbala is a profoundly holy site in Shia Islam. Alongside his shrine stands the Shrine of Abbas, Husayn's half-brother, standard-bearer, and one of his principal supporters. The main event is the Arba'in pilgrimage, where up to 40 million visit the shrines. Most of the pilgrims travel on foot and come from all around Iraq and nearly 60 countries. While rooted in Shia Islam, the Arba'in pilgrimage has emerged as a symbol of interfaith engagement. It increasingly attracts participants from various religious backgrounds, who all come to commemorate and mourn the martyrdom of Husayn. Arba'in is the largest annual public gathering on earth.

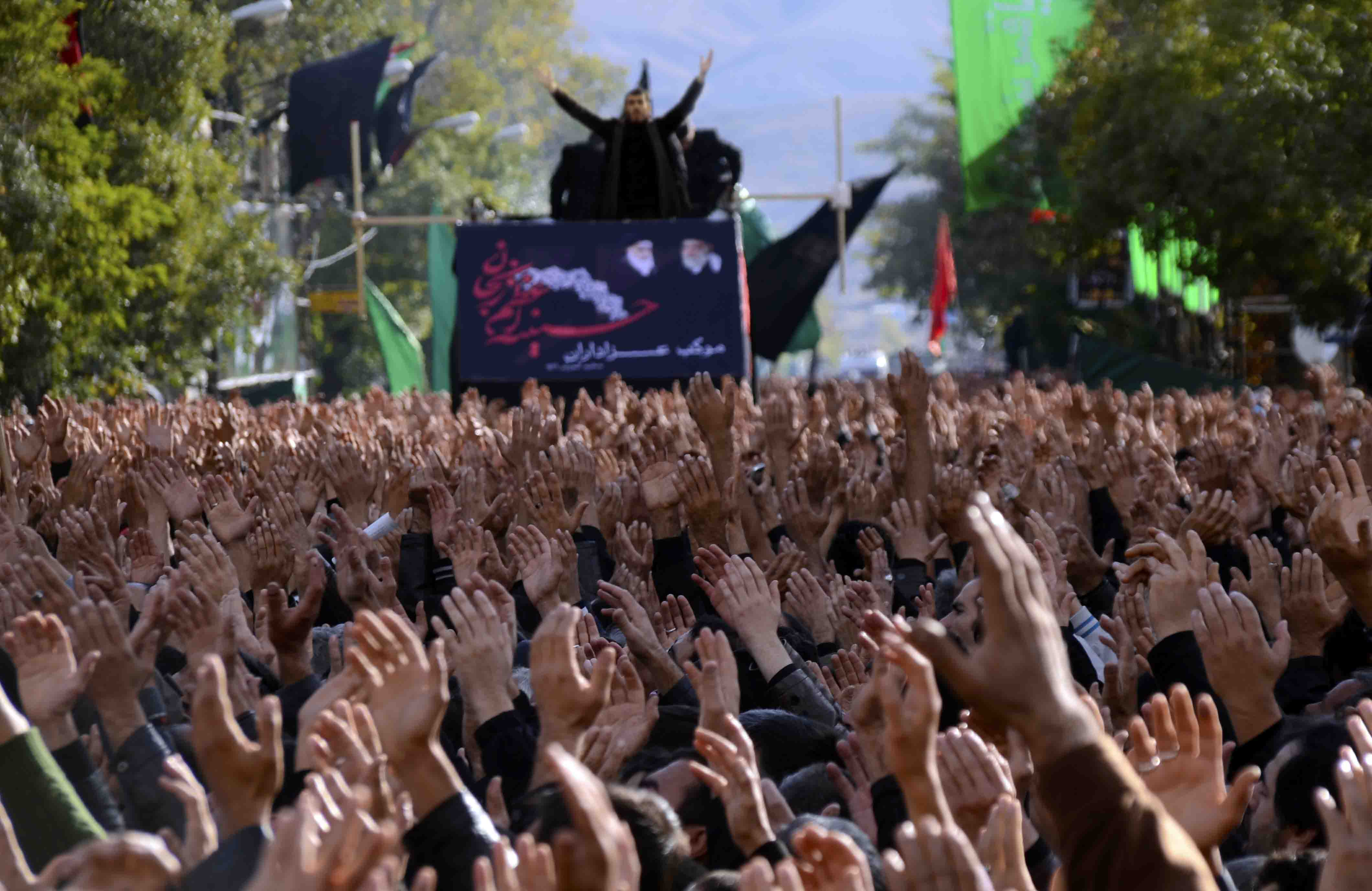
Ritual of chest beating

Husayn's death at Karbala is believed by Shi'as to be a sacrifice made to prevent the corruption of Islam by tyrannical rulers and to protect its ideology. His suffering became a symbol of sacrifice in the struggle for right against wrong, and for justice and truth against injustice and falsehood. He is believed to have been fully aware of his fate and the outcome of his revolt, which was divinely ordained. He is thus remembered as the prince of martyrs (Sayyed al-Shuhada). The historian G. R. Hawting describes the Battle of Karbala as a "supreme" example of "suffering and martyrdom" for Shi'as. According to Abdulaziz Sachedina, it is seen by Shi'as the climax of suffering and oppression, revenge for which came to be one of the primary goals of many Shi'a uprisings. This revenge is believed to be one of the fundamental objectives of the future revolution of the twelfth Shi'a Imam Muhammad al-Mahdi, whose return is awaited. With his return, Husayn and his seventy-two companions are expected to be resurrected along with their killers, who will then be punished.

=== Shia observances ===
Pilgrimages to Husayn's tomb are believed by Shi'as to be a source of divine blessings and rewards. According to Shi'a tradition the first such visit was performed by Husayn's son Ali Zayn al-Abidin and the surviving family members during their return from Syria to Medina. The first historically recorded visit is Sulayman ibn Surad and the Penitents going to Husayn's grave before their departure to Syria. They are reported to have lamented and beaten their chests and to have spent a night by the tomb. Thereafter this tradition was limited to the Shi'a Imams for several decades, before gaining momentum under the sixth Shi'a Imam Ja'far al-Sadiq and his followers. Buyids and Safavids also encouraged this practice. Special visits are paid on 10 Muharram (Ashura pilgrimage) and 40 days after the anniversary of Husayn's (Arba'in pilgrimage). The soil of Karbala is considered to have miraculous healing effects.

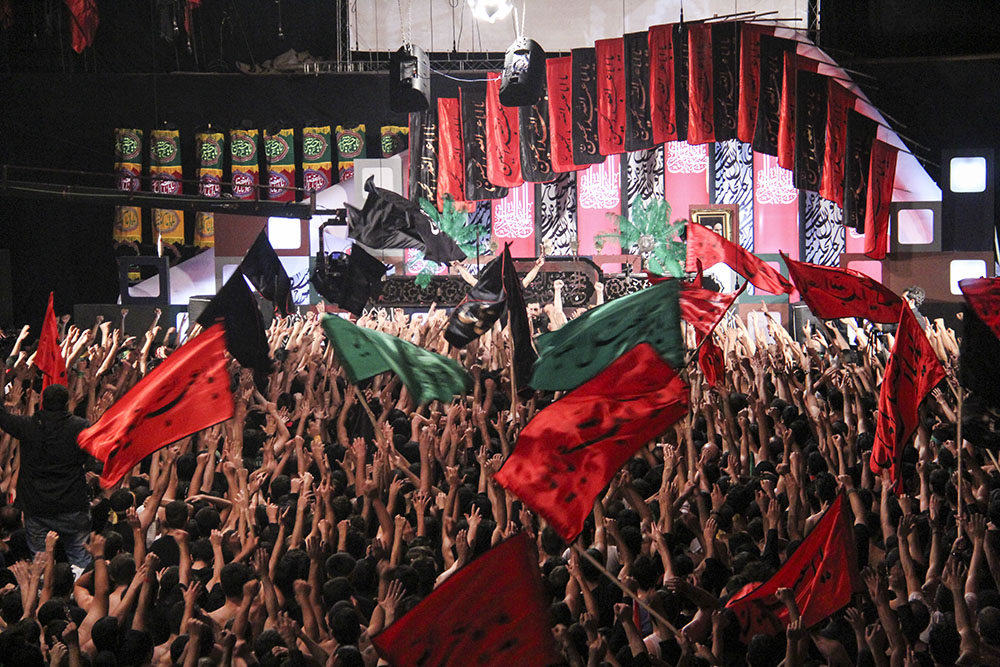
Muharram mourning ceremony at a large Husayniyya.

Mourning for Husayn is believed by Shi'as to be a source of salvation in the afterlife, and is undertaken as a remembrance of his suffering. After the death of Husayn, when his family was being taken to Ibn Ziyad, Husayn's sister Zaynab is reported to have cried out after seeing his headless body: "O Muhammad!... Here is Husayn in the open, stained with blood and with limbs torn off. O Muhammad! Your daughters are prisoners, your progeny are killed, and the east wind blows dust over them." Shi'a Muslims consider this to be the first instance of wailing and mourning over the death of Husayn. Husayn's son Zayn al-Abideen is reported to have spent the rest of his life weeping for his father. Similarly, Husayn's mother Fatima is believed to be weeping for him in paradise and the weeping of believers is considered to be a way of sharing her sorrows. Special gatherings (majalis; sing. majlis) are arranged in places reserved for this purpose, called husayniyyas. In these gatherings the story of Karbala is narrated and various elegies (rawda) are recited by professional reciters (rawda khwan).

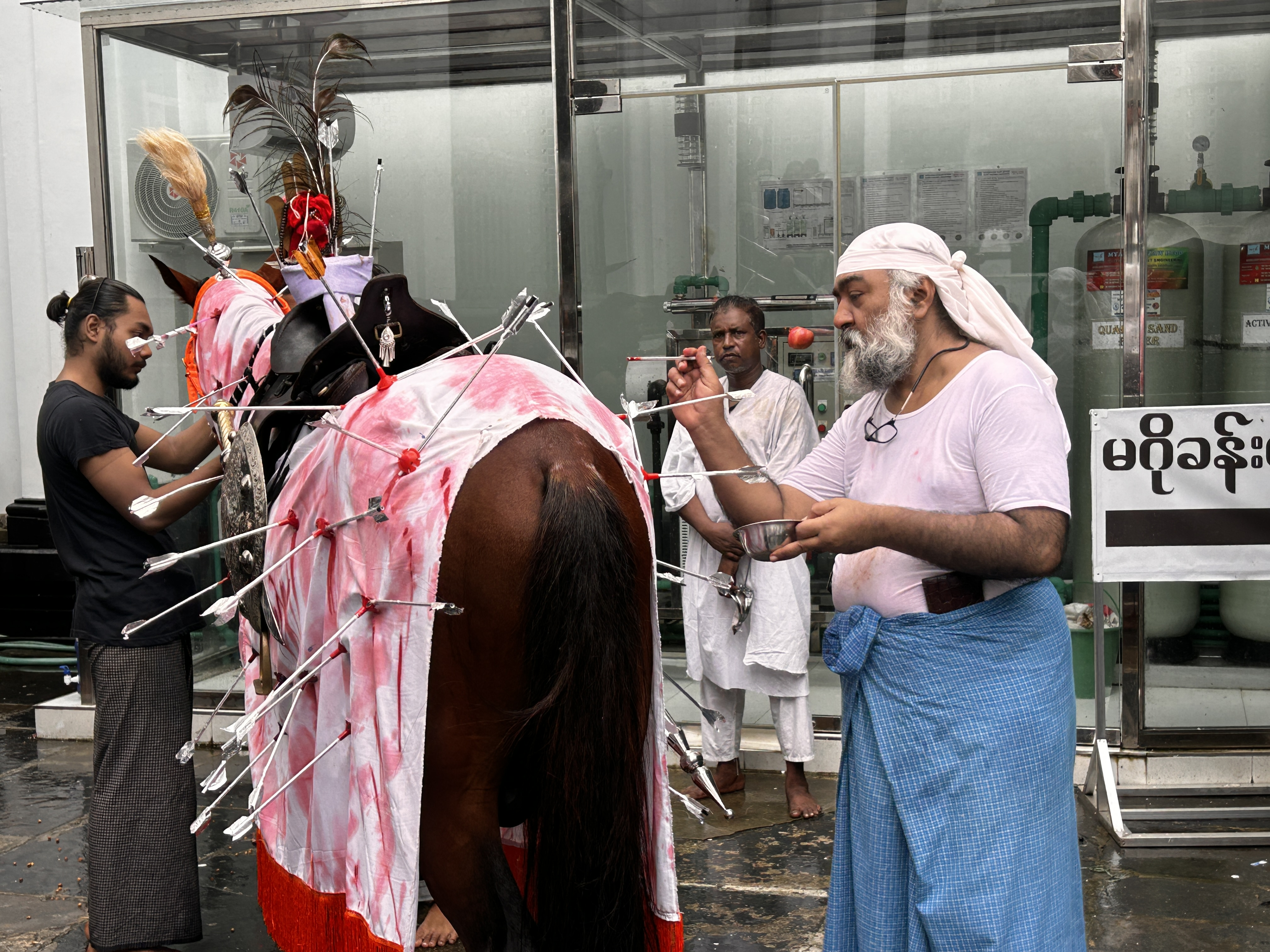
Shias in Myanmar decorating a Zuljanah horse for Ashura.

During the month of Muharram, elaborate public processions are performed in commemoration of the Battle of Karbala. In contrast to pilgrimage to Husayn's tomb and simple lamenting, these processions arose during the tenth century. Their earliest recorded instance was in Baghdad in 963 during the reign of the first Buyid ruler Mu'izz al-Dawla. The processions start from a husayniyya and the participants parade barefoot through the streets, wailing and beating their chests and heads before returning to the husayniyya for a majlis. Sometimes, chains and knives are used to inflict wounds and physical pain. In South Asia, an ornately tacked horse called zuljanah, representing Husayn's battle horse, is also led riderless through the streets. In Iran, the battle scenes of Karbala are performed on stage in front of an audience in a ritual called ta'ziyeh (from Arabic taʿziya 'condolence'), also known as shabih-khani. In India however, tazias refer to the coffins and replicas of Husayn's tomb carried in processions.

Most of these rituals take place during the first ten days of Muharram, reaching a climax on the tenth day, although majalis can also occur throughout the year. According to Yitzhak Nakash, the rituals of Muharram have an "important" effect in the "invoking the memory of Karbala", as these help consolidate the collective identity and memory of the Shi'a community. Anthropologist Michael Fischer states that commemoration of the Battle of Karbala by the Shi'a is not only the retelling of the story, but also presents them with "life models and norms of behavior" which are applicable to all aspects of life, which he calls the Karbala Paradigm. According to Olmo Gölz, the Karbala Paradigm provide Shi'as with heroic norms and a martyr ethos, representing an embodiment of the battle between good and evil, justice and injustice. However, rituals involving self-flagellation have been criticized by many Shi'a scholars. Iranian supreme leader Ayatollah Ali Khamenei has banned the practice in Iran since 1994.

=== Politics ===
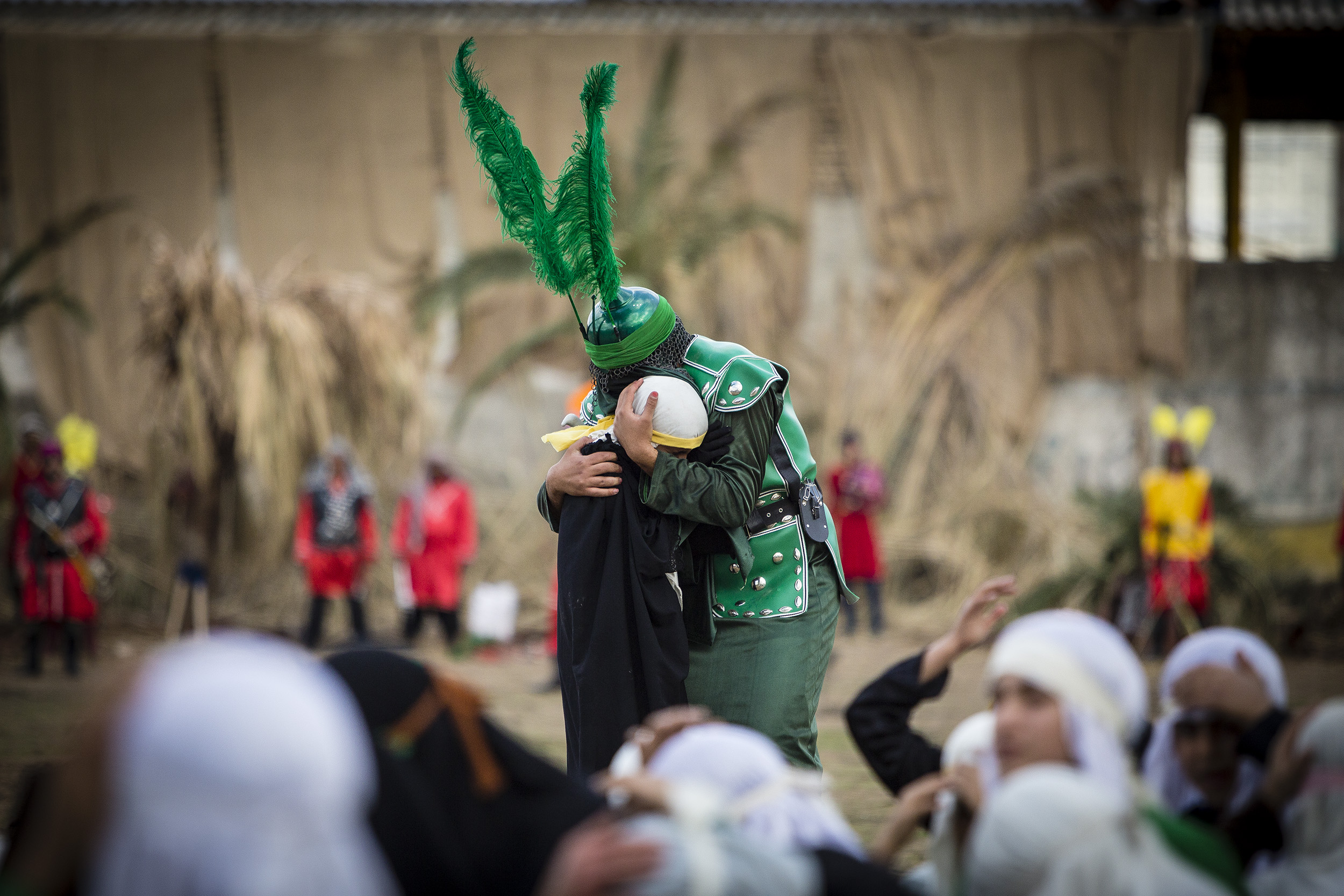
A ta'ziyeh performance in Iran

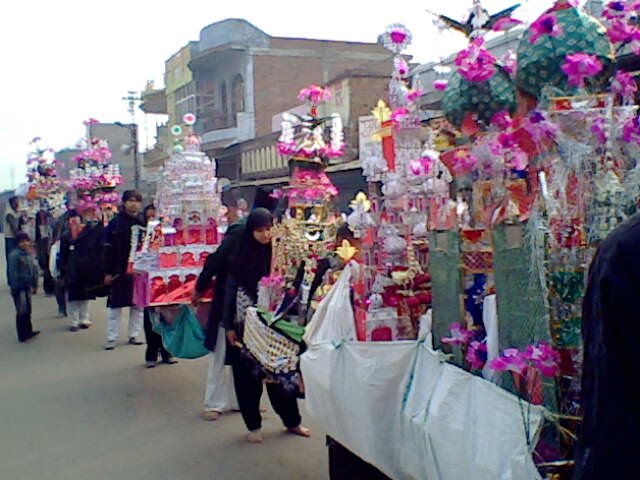
A procession of tazias in India

The first political use of the death of Husayn seems to have been during the revolt of Mukhtar. Although the Penitents had used the slogan "Revenge for Husayn", they do not seem have had a political program. In order to enhance their legitimacy, Abbasid rulers claimed to have avenged the death of Husayn by dethroning the Umayyads. During the early years of their rule, they also encouraged Muharram rituals. When the Shi'a Buyid dynasty occupied Baghdad, they promoted the public rituals of Muharram to portray themselves as patrons of religion and to strengthen Shi'a identity in Iraq. After taking over Iran in 1501, the Safavids declared the state religion to be Twelver Shi'ism. In this regard, Karbala and Muharram rituals came to be a vehicle of Safavid propaganda and a means of consolidating Iran's Shi'a identity. The founder of the Safavid dynasty, Shah Ismail, considered himself to be the Mahdi (the twelfth Shi'a Imam) or his forerunner. Similarly, the Qajars also patronized Muharram rituals such as processions, taziya and majalis, to improve the relationship between the state and the public.

==== Contemporary influence ====
Throughout the 20th and 21st centuries, Shi’ites have interpreted Husayn's martyrdom at Karbala as symbolic of religious and political resistance against oppression. They view Husayn as a role model in their daily lives, drawing inspiration for their religious and political resistance against perceived anti-Shia forces, whether domestic or international. Lebanese Shi'ite organization Hezbollah compared Husayn's fight against those who tried to kill him and his family to Hezbollah's conflicts with Israel and the South Lebanon Army, asserting that Hezbollah operatives who died in martyrdom operations against them died glorious and heroic martyrs' death.

Karbala and Shia symbolism played a significant role in the Iranian Revolution. In contrast to the traditional view of Shi'ism as a religion of suffering, mourning and political quietism, Shi'a Islam and Karbala were given a new interpretation in the period preceding the revolution by rationalist intellectuals and religious revisionists like Jalal Al-e-Ahmad, Ali Shariati and Nematollah Salehi Najafabadi. According to these, Shi'ism was an ideology of revolution and political struggle against tyranny and exploitation, and the Battle of Karbala and the death of Husayn was to be seen as a model for revolutionary struggle; weeping and mourning was to be replaced by political activism to realize the ideals of Husayn.

After the White Revolution reforms of the Iranian Shah Mohammad Reza Pahlavi, which were opposed by the Iranian clergy and others, Ruhollah Khomeini labelled the Shah as the Yazid of his time. Condemning the Iranian monarchy, Khomeini wrote: "The struggle of al-Husayn at Karbalâ is interpreted in the same way as a struggle against the non-Islamic principle of monarchy." Opposition to the Shah was thus compared with the opposition of Husayn to Yazid, and Muharram ritual gatherings became increasingly political in nature. According to Aghaie, the Shah's hostility towards various Muharram rituals, which he considered to be uncivilized, contributed to his fall. The Islamic republic that was established after the revolution has since promoted Muharram rituals. The clerics encourage public participation in elections as a form of "political activism" comparable to that of Husayn. Martyrdom spirit influenced by the death of Husayn was frequently witnessed in Iranian troops during the Iran–Iraq War.

== In literature and art ==
=== Maqtal literature and legendary accounts ===
Maqtal (pl. Maqatil) works narrate the story of someone's death. Although Maqatil on various other deaths have been written, the Maqtal genre has focused mainly on Husayn's death, such as Abu Mikhnaf's Maqtal and other Arabic Maqatil. Maqtal later entered Persian, Turkish, and Urdu literature, and inspired the development of rawda.

Most of the Maqatil mix history with legend and have elaborate details on Husayn's miraculous birth, which is stated to be on 10 Muharram, coinciding with his date of death. The universe as well as humanity are described as having been created on the day of Ashura (10 Muharram). Ashura is also asserted to have been the day of both Abraham's and Muhammad's birth and of the ascension of Jesus to heaven, and of numerous other events concerning prophets. Husayn is claimed to have performed various miracles, including quenching his companions' thirst by putting his thumb in their mouths and satisfying their hunger by bringing down food from the heavens, and to have killed several thousand Umayyad attackers. Other accounts claim that when Husayn died, his horse shed tears and killed many Umayyad soldiers; the sky became red and it rained blood; angels, jinns and wild animals wept; that light emanated from Husayn's severed head and that it recited the Qur'an; and that all of his killers met calamitous end.

=== Marthiya and rawda ===
When Shi'ism became the official religion of Iran in the 16th century, Safavid rulers such as Shah Tahmasp I patronized poets who wrote about the Battle of Karbala. The genre of marthiya (poems in the memory of the dead, with popular forms of Karbala related marthiya being rawda and nawha), according to Persian scholar Wheeler Thackston, "was particularly cultivated by the Safavids." Various Persian authors wrote texts retelling romanticized and synthesized versions of the battle and events from it, including Sa'id al-Din's Rawdat al-Islam (The Garden of Islam) and Al-Khawarazmi's Maqtal nur 'al-'a'emmah (The Site of the Murder of the Light of the Imams). These influenced the composition of the more popular text Rawdat al-Shuhada (Garden of Martyrs), which was written in 1502 by Husain Wa'iz Kashefi. Kashefi's composition was an effective factor in the development of rawda khwani, a ritual recounting of the battle events in majalis. Inspired by Rawdat al-Shuhada, the Azerbaijani poet Fuzûlî wrote an abridged and simplified version of it in Ottoman Turkish in his work Hadiqat al-Su'ada. It influenced similar works in Albanian on the subject.

Dalip Frashëri's Kopshti i te Mirevet is the earliest, and longest epic so far, written in the Albanian language; the Battle of Karbala is described in detail and Frashëri eulogizes those who fell as martyrs, in particular Husayn. Urdu marthiya is predominantly religious in nature and usually concentrates on lamenting the Battle of Karbala. South Indian rulers of Bijapur (Ali Adil Shah), and Golkonda Sultanate (Muhammad Quli Qutb Shah) were patrons of poetry and encouraged Urdu marthiya recitation in Muharram. Urdu marthiya afterwards became popular throughout India. Famous Urdu poets Mir Taqi Mir, Mirza Rafi Sauda, Mir Anees, and Mirza Salaamat Ali Dabeer have also composed marthiya. Comparing Karl Marx with Husayn, Josh Malihabadi argues that Karbala is not a story of the past to be recounted by the religious clerics in majalis, but should be seen as a model for revolutionary struggle towards the goal of a classless society and economic justice. South Asian philosopher and poet Muhammad Iqbal sees Husayn's sacrifice as being similar to that of Ishmael and compares Yazid's opposition to Husayn with the opposition of Pharaoh to Moses. Urdu poet Ghalib compares Husayn's suffering with that of Mansur al-Hallaj, a tenth century Sufi, who was executed on a charge of claiming divinity.

=== Sufi poetry ===
In Sufism, where annihilation of the self (nafs) and suffering in the path of God are paramount principles, Husayn is seen as a model Sufi. Persian Sufi poet Hakim Sanai describes Husayn as a martyr, higher in rank than all the other martyrs of the world; while Farid ud-Din Attar considers him a prototype of a Sufi who sacrificed himself in the love of God. Jalal ud-Din Rumi describes Husayn's suffering at Karbala as a means to achieve union with the divine, and hence considers it to be a matter of jubilation rather than grief. Sindhi Sufi poet Shah Abdul Latif Bhittai devoted a section in his Shah Jo Risalo to the death of Husayn, in which the incident is remembered in laments and elegies. He too sees Husayn's death as a sacrifice made in the path of God, and condemns Yazid as being bereft of divine love. Turkish Sufi Yunus Emre labels Husayn, along with his brother Hasan, as the "fountain head of the martyrs" and "Kings of the Paradise" in his songs.

=== Paintings and murals ===
Although Islamic clerics have disapproved of pictorial representation of early figures of Islam, the popularity of the taziya passion plays in Iran facilitated public acceptance of such representations in the form of paintings depicting battle scenes. The paintings, called shamayel or parda, originated in the Qajar era and were not intended as professional works of high art, but rather as popular representations for the taziya scenes. The "cartoon style" paintings usually depict multiple battle scenes on a single canvas as well as scenes from the hereafter showing Husayn and his supporters enjoying Paradise and their enemies burning in hell. They are often used to decorate husayniyyas. The shamayel subsequently gave rise to murals when scenes started to be painted directly on walls.

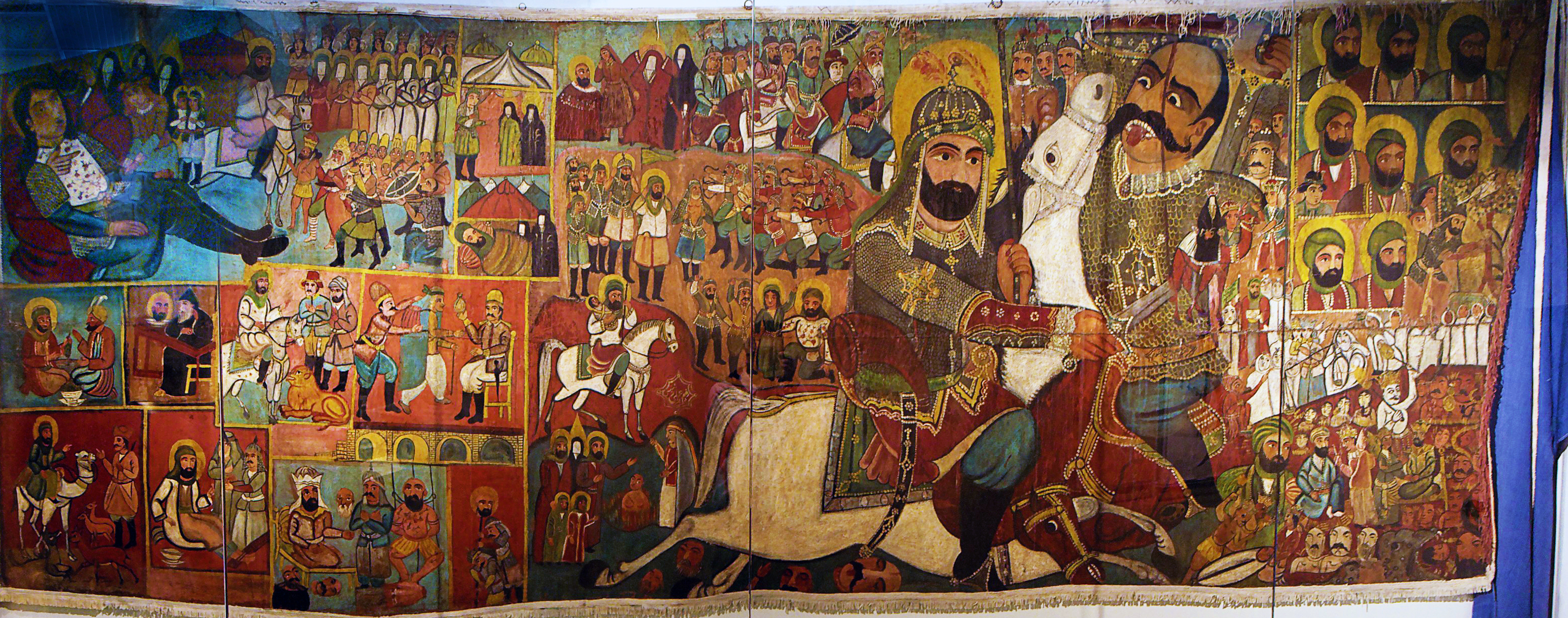
Depiction of the Twelve Imams and episodes from their lives including the Battle of Karbala and the end times, Iranian painting, oil on canvas, 19th century from the Tropenmuseum

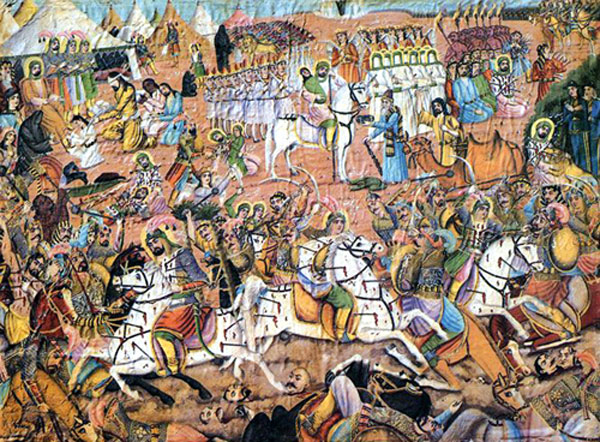
The Battle of Karbala By Iranian artist Mohammad Modabber, 1890–1966.

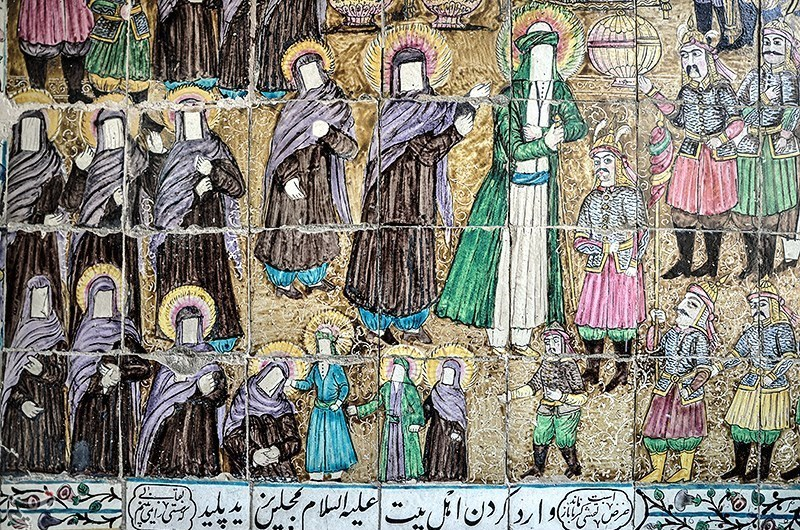
Tilework inside Mu'awin ul-Mulk Husayniyya in Kermanshah, Iran, depicting Husayn's son and the fourth Shia Imam Ali al-Sajjad, Husayn's sister Zaynab, and other prisoners being taken to Yazid's court.

== Bibliography ==
- Aghaie, Kamran S. (2004). The Martyrs of Karbala: Shi'i Symbols and Rituals in Modern Iran. Seattle & London: University of Washington Press. ISBN 978-0-295-98455-1.
- al-Balādhurī, Aḥmad ibn Yaḥyā (1996) [860–880]. Zakar, Suhail (ed.). Ansab al-Ashraf, Vol. 3 (Dar al-Fikr ed.). Beirut, Lebanon: Dar al-Fikr.
- Anthony, Sean (2011). The Caliph and the Heretic: Ibn Sabaʾ and the Origins of Shīʿism. Leiden: E. J. Brill. ISBN 978-90-04-21606-8.
- Arjomand, Saïd A. (2016). Sociology of Shiʿite Islam: Collected Essays. Leiden: E. J. Brill. ISBN 978-9004326279.
- Armajani, Jon (2020). Shia Islam and Politics: Iran, Iraq, and Lebanon. Lanham (Md.): Lexington Books. ISBN 978-1-7936-2136-8.
- Ayoub, Mahmoud (1978). Redemptive Suffering in Islam: A Study of the Devotional Aspects of Ashura in Twelver Shi'ism. Hague: Mouton Publishers. ISBN 90-279-7943-X.
- Borrut, Antoine (2015). "Remembering Karbalāʾ: the construction of an early Islamic site of memory". Jerusalem Studies in Arabic and Islam. 42: 249–282.
- Brunner, Rainer (2013). "Karbala". In Bowering, Gerhard; Crone, Patricia; Mirza, Mahan; Kadi, Wadad; Zaman, Muhammad Qasim; Stewart, Devin J. (eds.). The Princeton Encyclopedia of Islamic Political Thought. New Jersey: Princeton University Press. p. 293. ISBN 978-0691134840.
- Calmard, Jean (1982). "ʿAbbās b. ʿAlī b. Abū Ṭāleb". Encyclopaedia Iranica. Vol. 1. Encyclopædia Iranica Foundation.
- Calmard, Jean (2004). "Ḥosayn b. ʿAli II. In Popular Shiʿism". Encyclopaedia Iranica. Vol. 7. Encyclopædia Iranica Foundation.
- Chelkowski, Peter (1989). "Narrative Painting and Painting Recitation in Qajar Iran". Muqarnas. 6: 98–111. doi:10.1163/22118993-90000238. JSTOR 1602284.
- Chittick, William C. (1986). "Rūmī's view of the Imam Ḥusayn". Al-Serāt: Papers from the Imam Ḥusayn Conference, London, July 1984. Vol. 12. London: The Muhammadi Trust of Great Britain and Northern Ireland. pp. 3–12. ISBN 978-0710302076.
- Daftary, Farhad (1990). The Ismāʿı̄lı̄s: Their History and Doctrines (1st ed.). Cambridge: Cambridge University Press. ISBN 978-0-521-37019-6.
- Dakake, Maria M. (2007). The Charismatic Community: Shi'ite Identity in Early Islam. Albany: State University of New York Press. ISBN 978-0-7914-7033-6.
- Dixon, Abd al-Ameer A. (1971). The Umayyad Caliphate, 65–86/684–705: (a Political Study). London: Luzac. ISBN 978-0718901493.
- Donaldson, Dwight M. (1933). The Shi'ite Religion: A History of Islam in Persia and Irak. London: Luzac. OCLC 459263076.
- Donner, Fred M. (2010). Muhammad and the Believers, at the Origins of Islam. Cambridge, MA: Harvard University Press. ISBN 978-0-674-05097-6.
- Elsie, Robert (2005). Albanian Literature: A Short History. London & New York: I.B. Tauris. ISBN 978-1845110314.
- Fischer, Michael M. J. (2003). Iran: From Religious Dispute to Revolution. Madison: The University of Wisconsin Press. ISBN 978-0299184735.
- Fitzpatrick, Coeli; Walker, Adam H. (2014). Muhammad in History, Thought, and Culture: An Encyclopedia of the Prophet of God [2 volumes]. Santa Barbara, CA: ABC-CLIO. ISBN 978-1-61069-178-9.
- Gölz, Olmo (2019). "Martyrdom and Masculinity in Warring Iran:The Karbala Paradigm, the Heroic, and the Personal Dimensions of War". Behemoth: A Journal on Civilisation. 12 (1): 35–51. doi:10.6094/behemoth.2019.12.1.1005.
- Günther, Sebastian (1994). "Maqâtil Literature in Medieval Islam". Journal of Arabic Literature. 25 (3): 192–212. doi:10.1163/157006494X00103.
- Halm, Heinz (1997). Shi'a Islam: From Religion to Revolution. Translated by Allison Brown. Princeton: Markus Wiener Publishers. ISBN 1-55876-134-9.
- Hanaway, W. L. Jr. (1991). "Marthiya in Persian literature". In Bosworth, C. E.; van Donzel, E. & Pellat, Ch. (eds.). The Encyclopaedia of Islam, Second Edition. Volume VI: Mahk–Mid. Leiden: E. J. Brill. pp. 608–609. ISBN 978-90-04-08112-3.
- Hawting, Gerald R. (2000). The First Dynasty of Islam: The Umayyad Caliphate AD 661–750 (Second ed.). London and New York: Routledge. ISBN 0-415-24072-7.
- Hawting, Gerald R. (2002). "Yazid (I) b. Mu'awiya". In Bearman, P. J.; Bianquis, Th.; Bosworth, C. E.; van Donzel, E. & Heinrichs, W. P. (eds.). The Encyclopaedia of Islam, Second Edition. Volume XI: W–Z. Leiden: E. J. Brill. ISBN 978-90-04-12756-2.
- Haywood, J. A. (1991). "Marthiya in Urdu literature". In Bosworth, C. E.; van Donzel, E. & Pellat, Ch. (eds.). The Encyclopaedia of Islam, Second Edition. Volume VI: Mahk–Mid. Leiden: E. J. Brill. pp. 610–612. ISBN 978-90-04-08112-3.
- Hitti, Philip K. (1961). The Near East in History: A 5000 Year Story. Princeton, NJ: D. Van Nostrand Company. Reprint: ISBN 978-1258452452.
- Howard, I. K. A. (1986). "Husayn the Martyr: A Commentary on the Accounts of the Martyrdom in Arabic Sources". Al-Serāt: Papers from the Imam Ḥusayn Conference, London, July 1984. Vol. 12. London: The Muhammadi Trust of Great Britain and Northern Ireland. pp. 124–142. ISBN 978-0710302076.
- Howard, I. K. A., ed. (1990). The History of al-Ṭabarī, Volume XIX: The Caliphate of Yazīd ibn Muʿāwiyah, A.D. 680–683/A.H. 60–64. SUNY Series in Near Eastern Studies. Albany, New York: State University of New York Press. ISBN 978-0-7914-0040-1.
- Howard-Johnston, James (2010). Witnesses to a World Crisis: Historians and Histories of the Middle East in the Seventh Century. Oxford: Oxford University Press. ISBN 978-0-19-920859-3.
- Hyder, Syed Akbar (2006). Reliving Karbala: Martyrdom in South Asian Memory. Oxford: Oxford University Press. ISBN 978-0-19-537302-8.
- Jafri, S. M. (1979). Origins and Early Development of Shi'a Islam. London & New York: Longman. ISBN 978-0582780804.
- Kennedy, Hugh (2001). The Armies of the Caliphs: Military and Society in the Early Islamic State. London and New York: Routledge. ISBN 0-415-25093-5.
- Kennedy, Hugh (2004) [1986]. The Prophet and the Age of the Caliphates: The Islamic Near East from the 6th to the 11th Century (Second ed.). Harlow: Longman. ISBN 978-0-582-40525-7.
- Lammens, Henri (1921). Le Califat de Yazid Ier (in French). Beirut: Imprimerie Catholique Beyrouth. OCLC 474534621.
- Lammens, Henri (1927). "Al-Ḥasan b. 'Ali b. Abï Ṭālib". In Houtsma, M. Th.; Wesinck, A. J.; Arnold, T. W.; Heffening, W.; Lévi-Provençal, E. (eds.). The Encyclopædia of Islam: A Dictionary of the Geography, Ethnography and Biography of the Muhammadan Peoples. Vol. 2. Leiden: E. J. Brill. p. 274. OCLC 1008303874.
- Lewis, Bernard (2002). Arabs in History. Oxford: Oxford University Press. ISBN 978-0-19-164716-1.
- Madelung, Wilferd (1997). The Succession to Muhammad: A Study of the Early Caliphate. Cambridge: Cambridge University Press. ISBN 0-521-64696-0.
- Madelung, Wilferd (2004). "Ḥosayn b. ʿAli I. Life and Significance in Shiʿism". Encyclopaedia Iranica. Vol. 7. Encyclopædia Iranica Foundation.
- Momen, M. (1985). An Introduction to Shi'i Islam. Yale University Press. ISBN 978-0300035315.
- Munson, Henry (1988). Islam and Revolution in the Middle East. Yale University Press. ISBN 978-0300046045.
- Nakash, Yitzhak (1993). "An Attempt to Trace the Origin of the Rituals of 'Āshūrā". Die Welt des Islams. 33 (2): 161–181. doi:10.1163/157006093X00063.
- Norris, H. T. (1993). Islam in the Balkans: Religion and Society Between Europe and the Arab World. Columbia: University of South Carolina Press. ISBN 978-0872499775.
- Pinault, David (2001). Horse of Karbala: Muslim Devotional Life in India. New York: Palgrave. ISBN 978-1-349-61982-5.
- Sachedina, Abdulaziz A. (1981). Islamic Messianism: The Idea of Mahdi in Twelver Shi'ism. Albany: State University of New York Press. ISBN 978-0-87395-442-6.
- Schimmel, Annemarie (1975). Mystical Dimensions of Islam. Chapel Hill: The University of North Carolina Press. ISBN 978-0-8078-1271-6.
- Schimmel, Annemarie (1986). "Karbalā' and the Imam Husayn in Persian and Indo-Muslim literature". Al-Serāt: Papers from the Imam Ḥusayn Conference, London, July 1984. Vol. 12. London: The Muhammadi Trust of Great Britain and Northern Ireland. pp. 29–39. ISBN 978-0710302076.
- Sharon, Moshe (1983). Black Banners from the East: The Establishment of the ʻAbbāsid State: Incubation of a Revolt. Jerusalem: JSAI. ISBN 978-965-223-501-5.
- Sindawi, Khalid (2002). "The image of Ḥusayn ibn 'Alī in Maqātil Literature". Quaderni di Studi Arabi. 20–21: 79–104. JSTOR 25802958.
- Thackston, Wheeler M. (1994). A Millennium of Classical Persian Poetry: A Guide to the Reading & Understanding of Persian Poetry from the Tenth to the Twentieth Century. Bethesda: IBEX Publishers. ISBN 978-0936347509.
- Vaglieri, L. Veccia (1971). "(Al)-Ḥasan b. 'Alï b. Abï Ṭālib". In Lewis, B.; Ménage, V. L.; Pellat, Ch. & Schacht, J. (eds.). The Encyclopaedia of Islam, Second Edition. Volume III: H–Iram. Leiden: E. J. Brill. pp. 240–243. OCLC 495469525.
- Vaglieri, L. Veccia (1971). "(Al)-Ḥusayn b. 'Alï b. Abï Ṭālib". In Lewis, B.; Ménage, V. L.; Pellat, Ch. & Schacht, J. (eds.). The Encyclopaedia of Islam, Second Edition. Volume III: H–Iram. Leiden: E. J. Brill. pp. 607–615. OCLC 495469525.
- Wellhausen, Julius (1901). Die religiös-politischen Oppositionsparteien im alten Islam (in German). Berlin: Weidmannsche Buchhandlung. OCLC 453206240.
- Wellhausen, Julius (1927). The Arab Kingdom and Its Fall. Translated by Margaret Graham Weir. Calcutta: University of Calcutta.
- Yildirim, Riza (2015). "In the Name of Hosayn's Blood: The Memory of Karbala as Ideological Stimulus to the Safavid Revolution". Journal of Persianate Studies. 8 (2): 127–154. doi:10.1163/18747167-12341289.
- Zakeri, Mohsen (1995). Sāsānid Soldiers in Early Muslim Society: The Origins of ʿAyyārān and Futuwwa. Wiesbaden: Otto Harrassowitz. ISBN 978-3-447-03652-8.
