= Sermon of Zaynab in Kufa =

Sermon

Sermon of Zaynab in Kufa is a speech delivered by Zaynab bint Ali to people of Kufa. After the martyrdom of Hussain ibn Ali, women and children were taken in captivity. When the caravan of captives entered Kufa, people gathered to see the caravan. In this sermon, Zaynab admonished the people of Kufa for breaking their promises to Hussain and failed to support the Imam.

== Speaking of Zaynab ==
She praised God and sent greetings upon His Messenger and admonished people of Kufa for their dual behavior and their dereliction of duty in helping Hussain ibn Ali and promised them to have a great punishment for killing the Master of the Youths of the Paradise. After the sermon of Zaynab, people were stunned and agitated.

== Context ==
Zaynab bint Ali started her sermon with the praise of Allah"

Praise be to Allah and blessings be on my grandfather Muhammad and his purified and chosen progeny.

=== reproach kufia ===
Then she continued:

O people of Kufa, who deceive, forsake and contrive, it is you who weep. May Allah not halt your tears and may your chests burn incessantly with the fire of grief and sorrow. Your example is that of a woman who assiduously prepares a strong rope and then un- twines it herself, wasting her own hard labour.”

“You swear such false oaths, which bear no truthfulness at all. Beware that you have nothing except vain talk, false pride, mischief, malice, evil, rancour, falsehood, and sycophancy. Beware that your position is that of slave- maids and purchased girls who are but the meanest beings.”

“Your hearts are full of enmity and rancour. You are like the vegetation that grows on filthy soil and is yet green, or like the mortar applied unto graves.”

“You should know that you have perpetrated a very morbid deed and this has prepared an evil provision for your next life, because of which, Allah’s anger is against you and His wrath would fall upon you.”
