= Muhammad ibn Abd Allah ibn Ja'far =

Son of Abd Allah ibn Ja'far ibn Abi Talib (died 680)

Muḥammad ibn ʿAbd Allāh ibn Jaʿfar محمد بن عبدالله بن جعفر

Personal life
- Born: Medina
- Died: 10th of Muharram, 61 A.H. / 10 October, 680 Karbala, Umayyad Caliphate
- Cause of death: Martyred in the Battle of Karbala
- Resting place: Imam Husayn Shrine, Karbala, Iraq
- Parent(s): Abd Allah ibn Ja'far (father); Zaynab bint Ali (mother)
- Dynasty: Banu Hashim
- Known for: Being a companion of Husayn ibn Ali
- Relatives: Awn (brother)

Religious life
- Religion: Islam
- Dynasty: Banu Hashim

Muḥammad ibn ʿAbd Allāh ibn Jaʿfar (Arabic: محمد بن عبدالله بن جعفر) was Zaynab's son. Together with his brother Awn, Muhammad accompanied Husayn ibn Ali and they were martyrs of Karbala.

== Biography ==
His father was Abd Allah ibn Ja'far ibn Abi Talib, a companion of the Islamic prophet Muhammad, and his mother was Zaynab, the daughter of Ali ibn Abi Talib and Fatima. His paternal grandfather was Ja'far al-Tayyar, whom Muhammad (the prophet) had appointed as the head of the emigrants to Abyssinia.

== Accompanying Husayn ibn Ali ==
When Husayn ibn Ali moved from Mecca to Medina, Abd Allah ibn Ja'far wrote a letter to the Husayn and tried to change his mind. He sent the letter through his sons Muhammad and Awn, but when Abd Allah ibn Ja'far realized that the Imam is determined to go, he advised Muhammad and Awn to accompany Husayn ibn Ali.

== On the day of Ashura ==
Muhammad fought bravely and killed 10 warriors of enemy's army, but at the end was killed by Amir ibn Nahshal al-Tamimi.
