= Institute of Ismaili Studies =

Research institute in London

Coordinates: 51.526°N 0.1354°W

- Established: 1977
- Location: London, United Kingdom
- Website: www.iis.ac.uk

The Institute of Ismaili Studies (IIS) is a research institute in London, United Kingdom. It aims to promote the study of Muslim cultures and societies, both historical and contemporary, in order to foster a greater understanding of their relationships with other societies and faiths. It also functions as a gathering point for the Ismaili community as it endeavors to understand its own history and thought, including the often neglected fields of esoteric Islam and Shi'ism.

The institute draws upon the worldwide knowledge and experience of various institutions and scholars to create awareness through initiatives, publications, and partnerships in the field of Islamic Studies. Its library, which houses the largest-known accessible collection of Ismaili codices in the world, is a major resource in the field. In addition to its research, the IIS offers two graduate programmes: the Graduate Programme in Islamic Studies and Humanities (GPISH) and the Secondary Teacher Education Programme (STEP).

Established in 1977 by the Aga Khan, it functions under his guidance and works closely with the Institute for the Study of Muslim Civilizations at the Aga Khan University.

== History and conceptualization ==
=== Ismaili Society ===
Modern Ismaili studies first began in the 1930s in South Asia, where collections of Ismaili manuscripts had been preserved within Ismaili communities and brought to the fore through the pioneering efforts of Wladimir Ivanow, Asaf Fyzee, Husayn al-Hamdani, and Zahid Ali. Much of this early work helped to dispel the writings of the nineteenth century orientalists, which were often defamatory albeit unintentionally, having drawn only on the sources of the Ismailis' adversaries, while over-sensationalizing occidental accounts. Ivanow, in particular, played an important role in the creation of the Ismaili Society of Bombay, which was, in a sense, a precursor to the institute.

The former Ismaili Society of Bombay was established under the patronage of Sir Sultan Muhammed Shah Aga Khan III in February 1946. The Ismaili Society stood for "the promotion of independent and critical study of all matters connected with Ismailism" and frequently published monographs, critical editions of original texts and collections of short papers. Like the institute, the society's work was involved in studying the field of particular intellectual movements in Islam, with a specific interest in Shi'ism and Sufism. With these underlying premises, the Aga Khan chaired the Ismailia Association Conference in April 1975: a four-day meeting in Paris during which groundwork was laid for what was eventually to become the Institute of Ismaili Studies. In November 1977, the Aga Khan made a public announcement that formally proclaimed the inauguration of the institute. In his remarks the Aga Khan expressed his wish that the institute become a major institution for his community, while reflecting upon the Fatimid centres of learning established by his ancestors a millennium before.

=== Tradition of learning ===
The late Aga Khan III was instrumental in the transformation of Aligarh University, for which he campaigned starting as early as 1896. He also articulated the Muslims' need for a "Central University" – a place where religion and learning are never divorced and individuality is safeguarded from imitating other cultures – so that early in their lives, students would gain a sense "for truthfulness, and for independence of character". In subsequent years, Aga Khan III founded many schools in East Africa and South Asia. Most of these schools continue to exist today. He and his forefathers trace their ancestry back to the Fatimid Caliph-Imams who were among the first Muslims to establish institutes of higher learning in the history of Islamic civilization. Therefore, despite its recent foundation, the institute draws upon a long historical tradition that is firmly rooted in education and learning and equally cognizant thereof.

=== Governance ===
The institute operates under a Board of Governors of which the Aga Khan is chairman. Board members as of September 2022 include: Professor Ali Asani, Dr. Nadia Eboo Jamal, Karina Govindji, Dr. Arif Jamal, Professor Farid F Panjwani, Alykhan Kassam, Amyn Kassim-Lakha, Dr. Sharofat, Naguib Kheraj, Professor Nacim Pak-Shiraz, Habib Motani, Professor Tashmin Khamis, Dr. Shogufa Mir Malekyar, and Rahim Kara.

Dr. Farhad Daftary stepped down as co-director in September 2022, and took on the title of director emeritus. Dr. Zayn Kassam began her term as Director on 9 January 2023.

== Library and publications ==
The Institute of Ismaili Studies Library was established in 1979 and is a major resource at the institute, which houses the largest-known accessible collection of Ismaili codices in the world. Its role is to preserve, develop and make available a central archive of Ismaili manuscripts, printed texts and audiovisual materials, and to support the activities and programmes of the institute by providing necessary resources. The library's collection comprises some thirty thousand items, including rare manuscripts in Arabic, Persian and Gujarati. Many of these manuscripts are described in published catalogues.

The library also actively seeks to expand its holdings through new acquisitions, donations and by obtaining photocopies and microfilms of manuscripts that are held in various private and institutional collections. The library's collection has benefited from a number of private collections that have been donated such as the Dr. Zahid Ali collection of two hundred twenty rare manuscripts, and the Sherali Alidina collection. Much of the early collection, however, predates the foundation of the institute and represents the holdings of the Ismaili Society of Mumbai.

=== Publications ===
The institute's publications are manifold and range from curriculum materials to translations and academic publications. They reflect its mandate of promoting modern scholarship in the area of Islamic studies. Most of the works are published through Islamic Publications Ltd. (IPL) in association with I.B. Tauris & Co. Ltd..

The collection of curriculum materials produced by the institute's Department of Education for the religious and cultural education of the Ismaili community is known as the Ta'lim Programme. This curriculum is currently available at primary levels for ages four to twelve in eight different languages. The curriculum is also expected to further expand for students at a secondary school level in the near future. Seven types of academic publications are produced by the institute, as listed below:

1. Occasional papers or essays addressing broad themes on the relationship between religion and society, with special reference to Islam;
2. Monographs that explore specific aspects of the Islamic religions tradition;
3. Significant editions or translations of primary or secondary texts pertinent to the understanding of Islam;
4. Translations of poetic and literary texts, which illustrate the rich heritage of spiritual, devotional and symbolic expressions in Muslim history;
5. Works pertaining to Ismailism;
6. Proceedings of conferences and seminars sponsored by the institute;
7. Bibliographical works or catalogues.

== Programmes ==
The Institute of Ismaili Studies offers a variety of different programmes from the graduate level to preparatory programmes for Ismaili students who have not previously studied English, such as the Khorog English Programme and the Syrian Preparatory Program.

=== Graduate Programme in Islamic Studies and Humanities ===
The Graduate Programme in Islamic Studies and Humanities (GPISH) has a three-year duration. It aims to "engender a sympathetic yet critical examination of issues facing contemporary Muslims, from the debate amongst Muslim intellectuals regarding the re-examination of aspects of the Islamic heritage to the challenges posed by modernisation and development." The goal of the program is to prepare students for a research degree and a wide variety of career opportunities.

It focuses on Islam in general, and in particular on Shi'ism and the Ismaili community, its history, and its teachings as understood within the Islamic religious tradition. The programme integrates a variety of disciplines into the study of Muslim societies, including history, anthropology, political science, philosophical analysis, literature, aesthetics, art, and the study of religion. After two years of theory based learning, students embark on a field project during the summer of their second academic year. The final year of the programme is spent at a degree-granting university in the UK, where students study for a master's degree in a discipline that is resonant with the aims of the graduate programme.

All admitted students are provided with a full scholarship that covers tuition and housing, as well as a stipend covering living expenses. The institute also provides doctoral scholarships to suitable candidates, and preference is given those who have completed GPISH.

=== Secondary Teacher Education Programme ===
Founded in 2002, The Secondary Teacher Education Programme (STEP) is a two-year post-graduate programme that seeks to train and sustain teachers who will be instrumental in teaching the institute's Secondary Curriculum to Ismaili students worldwide. It culminates in an MTeach and an MA in education (Muslim Societies and Civilizations), both awarded by the University of London, and is the product of a partnership between Institute of Ismaili Studies and the University of London's Institute of Education.

Following the completion of the academic portion of the STEP program, students return to their home countries and participate in an in-service phase at their national Ismaili Tariqah and Religious Education Board/Committee (ITREB/C). Students are provided with a full scholarship and stipend that covers the entire program (including the home-based practicum), and related travel expenses.

The programme is currently open to applicants from thirteen countries: Canada, France, India, Kenya, Pakistan, Portugal, Syria, Tajikistan, Tanzania, UAE, Uganda, UK and the USA.
