= Sayyidah Zainab District =

District in Cairo, Egypt

Sayyida Zainab السيدة زينب
- District
- Sayyidah Zainab District
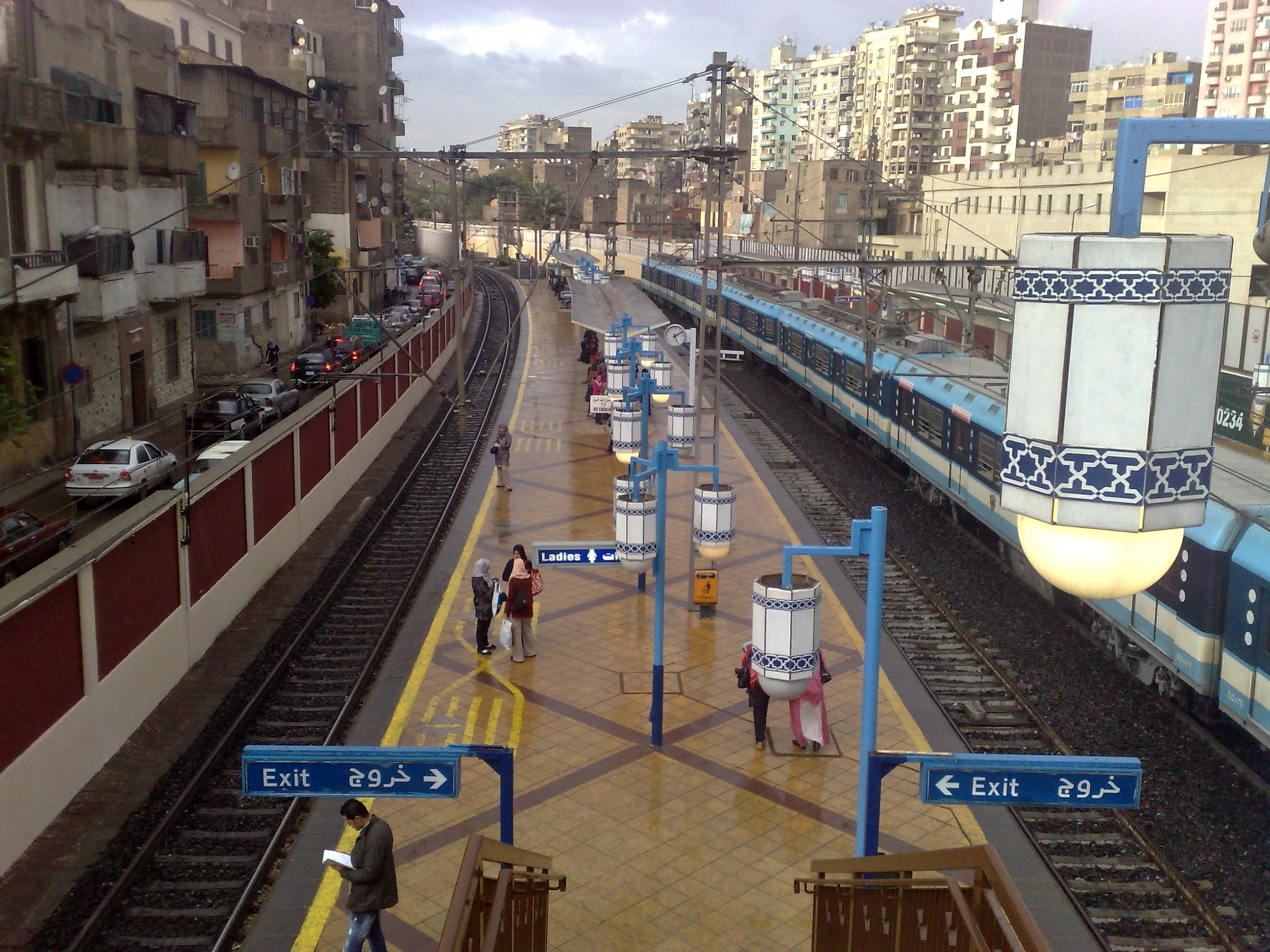
- Sayyidah Zainab Metro Station
- Interactive map of Sayyida Zainab
- Coordinates: 30°01′53″N 31°14′19″E
- Country: Egypt
- Province: Cairo
- Geocode: 359824

Sayyidah Zainab (Arabic: السيدة زينب) is one of the old traditional districts of Cairo, Egypt. Its name is based on the presence of the Sayyidah Zainab Mosque. It is known for its traditional restaurants, it also has the Qal'at al-Kabsh neighbourhood, which is one of the famous areas in the district, and the Ibn Tulun Mosque.

According to Egyptian media, Sayyidah Zeinab is one of the touristic attraction in Cairo, as it has many mosques and religious shrines, which makes it a destination for its historical sites and for religious tourism.

== The district ==
It is one of the neighborhoods of the southern region of Cairo Governorate and was formerly called South District, including Sayyidah Zainab, Al-Khalifa, and Mokattam. In 1998, the governor of Cairo separated some of the governorate's districts. The southern district was divided into Sayyidah Zainab, Khalifa, and Mokattam districts, hence the name became Sayyidah Zainab.

Sayyidah Zainab is one of the old traditional districts densely populated with residents and old estates and is home to the Sayyidah Zainab Mosque, which has been developed into a religious and tourist destination.

== Sayyidah Zainab Mosque ==
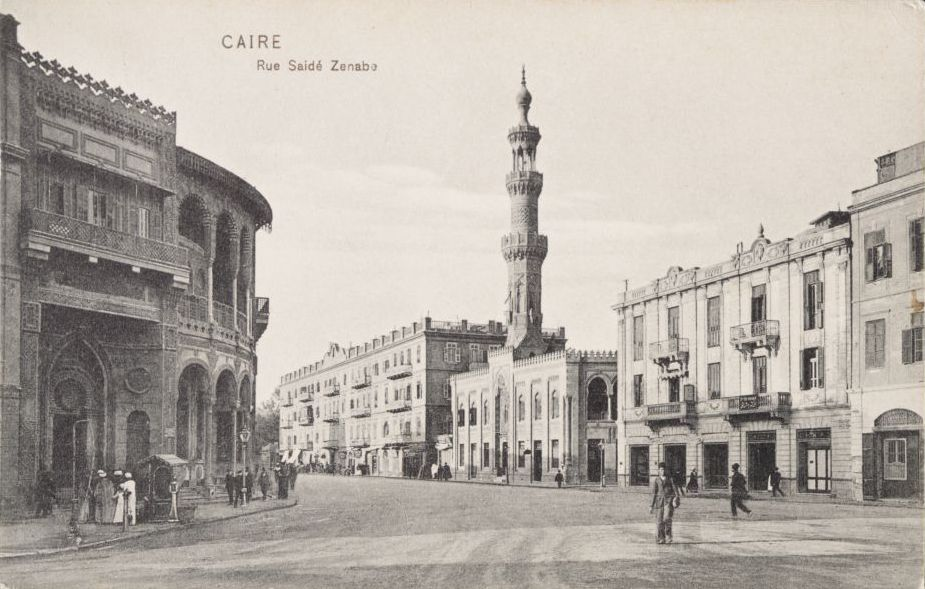
View of the Sayyida Zaynab Mosque and the street in front of it circa 1900

The mosque is located in Sayyidah Zainab Square, and this place was formerly known in the Mamluk era as Khatt al-Sabaa ( The Lions Line) in reference to a bridge built by Sultan al-Zahir Baybars (658 AH). The Khalij canal, which passed in front of the mosque, was filled in 1898, and with the filling process, the bridge disappeared and the façade of the Sayyidah Zainab Mosque appeared. From that date, at the end of the nineteenth century, the square and the entire district began to be called by the name of Sayyidah Zainab, who is buried inside the mosque. Sayyidah Zainab is the daughter of Ali ibn Abi Talib and her mother, Fatima al-Zahra, the daughter of Muhammad, and her maternal grandmother, Khadija bint Khuwaylid. Her brothers are Hassan and Hussein.

However, it is possible that Sayyidah Zainab, after whom the district was named, is Zainab bint Yahya ibn Zayd ibn Ali ibn al-Hussein ibn Ali ibn Abi Talib, who is buried in the scene next to the tomb of Amr ibn al-As.

== Al-Sebaa bridge ==
The area in front of Sayyidah Zainab Mosque was called Qantarat al-Sebaa. This referred to the bridge built by Baybars in front of Sayyidah Zeinab Mosque. The bridge was carved with an image of lions, his emblem. Ibn Daqmak in his book al-Intisar called it al-Qantara al-Zahiriya. It was located on the Khalij canal and was known as Qantarat al-Sayyidah Zainab and consisted of two bridges, one of which connected Al-Kumi Street to Al-Sadd Street. The second used to connect Marasina Street to Komi Street. When al-Nasir Muhammad built the Sultan's Square and visited it frequently, he used to ride on that bridge, he was annoyed by its height, so he ordered it to be demolished and made it wider than was and shorter than its height, and the work was completed in 1325 AD. When the central part of the canal was filled in, the bridges disappeared.

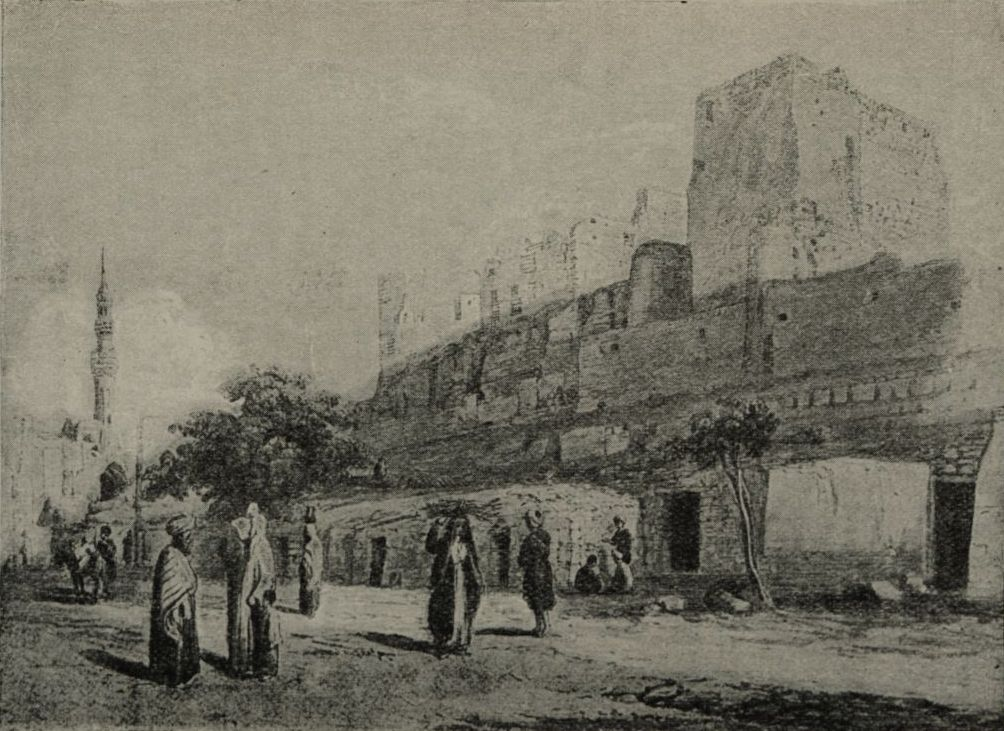
Al-Kabsh Castle in 1830, in the area now named after it (Qal'at al-Kabsh)

== Administrative borders ==
- Northern border: Abdeen District, Parliament St., Sawaika Al-Sebaeen St., Ismail Aboujebel St.
- Southern border: Misr al-Qadema District, Magra al-Ayoun Street.
- Eastern border: Central District, Port Said St., Khalifa District, Ahmed Omar St., Azbek Mosque St., west side of Ashraf St. and Sayyidah Nafisa Square.
- Western border: Western District, Qasr al-Aini Street, Misr al-Qadema District, Corniche St., from Manial Bridge to Foum al-Khaleeg Square.Sayyida Nafisa

=== Chiefdoms ===
- Abu al-Rish
- Alansha and Munira
- Baghala
- Hanafi
- Al-Derb
- El-Gedid
- Al-Sebaeen
- Al-Sayyidah
- Al-Atris
- Al-Aini Ram
- Zinhom Gardens
- Khairat
- Darb al-Gamameez
- Zeinhom
- Sankar
- Tulun
- Nasiriyah
- Qalet Al- Kabsh

== Landmarks and notable locations ==
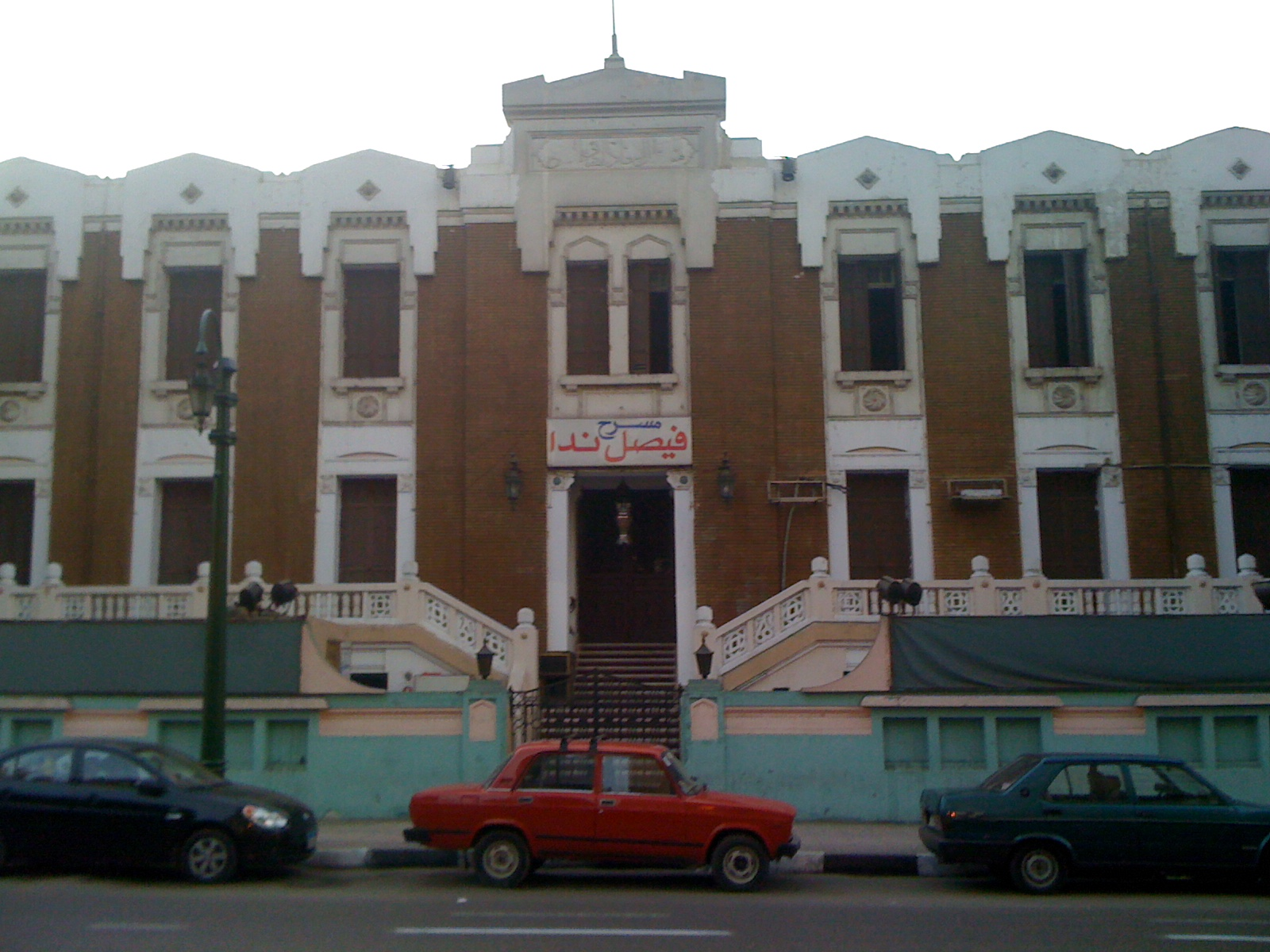
Faisal Nada theater

Sayyidah District boasts numerous attractions that draw visitors to the area, with the Sayyidah Zainab Mosque being a particularly prominent one. It attracts not only residents of Cairo but also individuals from across Egypt's various governorates and from abroad, who come to pray in her mosque and to celebrate her birthday, which is held annually in the month of Rajab.

The district is also known for its diversity of restaurants, which attracts people, particularly during the Islamic holy month of Ramadan. These include establishments specializing in Iftar and Suhoor meals and sweet shops such as Sobia Rahmani and Karnak.

=== Sunnia School ===
It is the first school established to educate girls in Egypt and is located on Al-Kumi Street.

=== Ibn Tulun Mosque ===
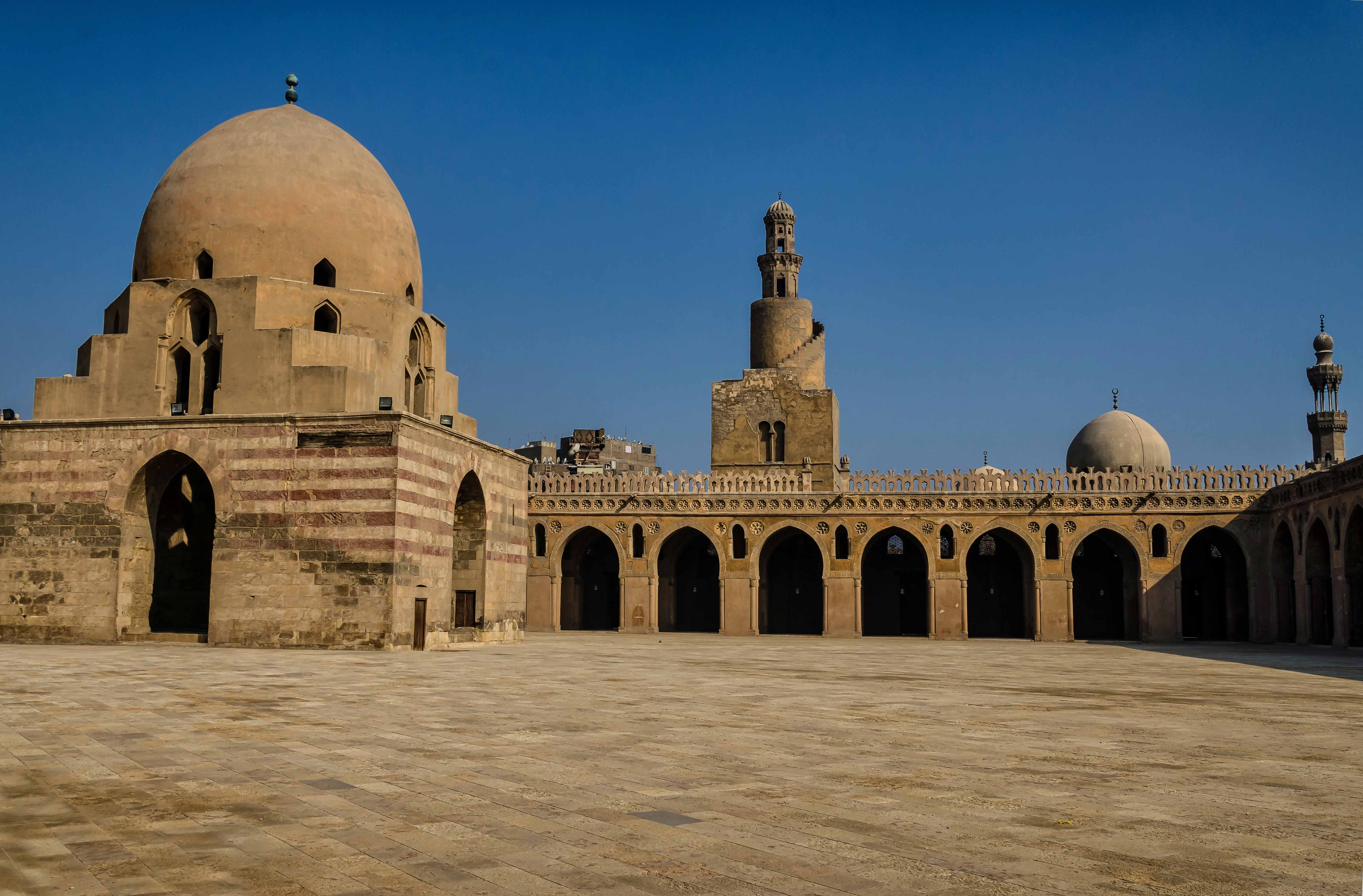
Interior of the Ibn Tulun Mosque, one of the district's main landmarks

It is a monumental mosque built by Ahmed ibn Tulun, the ruler of Egypt in the era of the Tulunids state, and is considered the third mosque built in Egypt after the Amr ibn al-As mosque. Ahmed ibn Tulun built the mosque on top of a mountain known as Mount Yashkar because he was afraid that if drowning or fires occurred in Egypt, this mosque would not fall down.

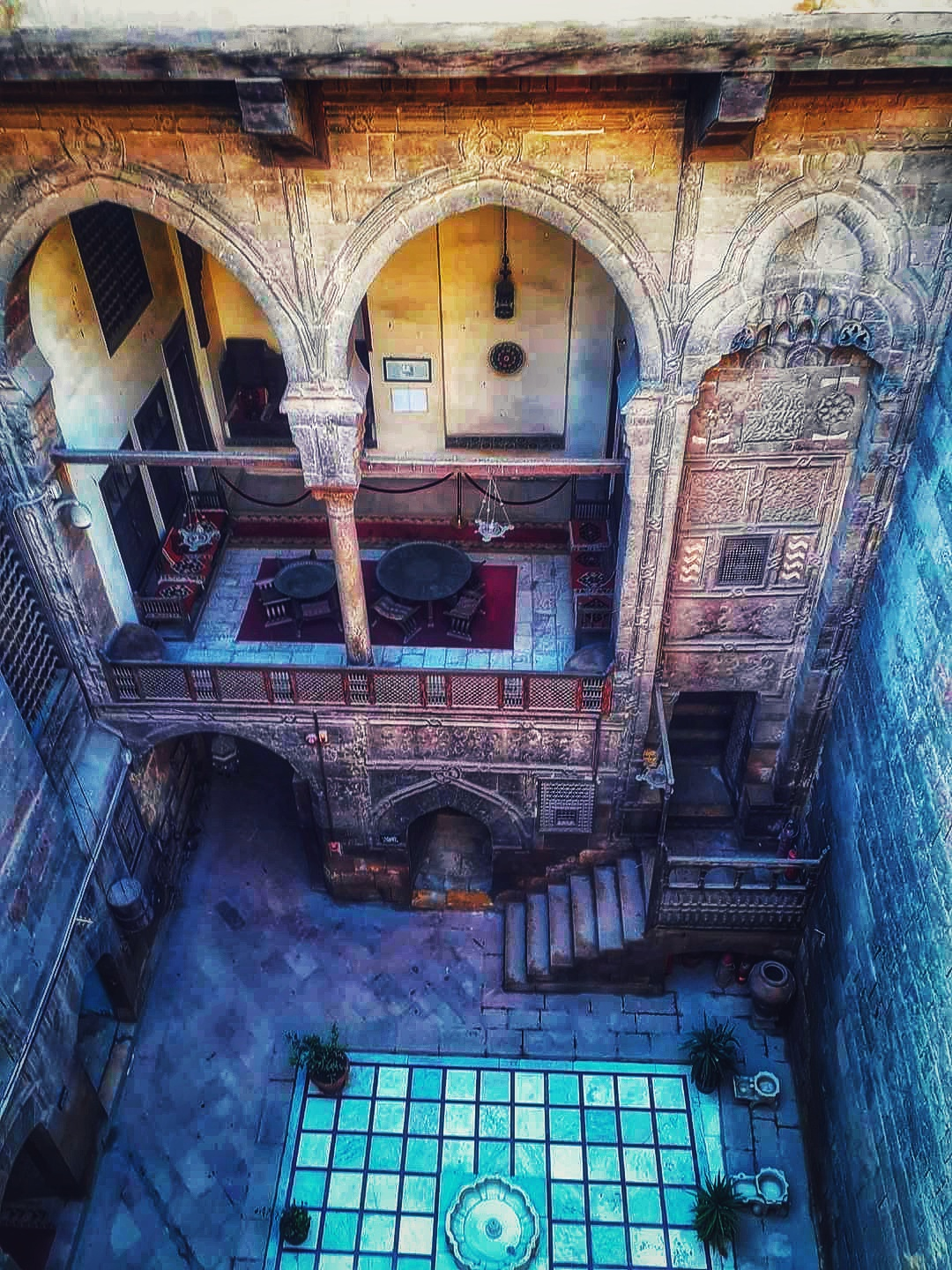
The Gayer-Anderson Museum, located next to the Ibn Tulun Mosque

=== Zeynhom neighborhood ===
It is one of the neighborhoods of Sayyidah Zainab, located on the southern side of it, this neighborhood is very popular, especially because of the presence of Imam Zain al-Abidin Mosque son of Imam Husayn ibn Ali, so the area was named after him Zain al-Abidin or Zeinhom. This neighborhood is notable for the presence of many landmarks beside Imam Zain Al-Abidin Mosque, there is 57357 Hospital for the treatment of pediatric cancer, and Al-Salakhana Street, which is known for selling meat, especially during the Eid Al-Adha period.

=== Qasr El-Eyni Street ===
It is one of the longest streets in Cairo and close to the Sayyidah Zainab district, starting from Foum al-Khaleeg Square and ending at Tahrir Square. To the left is the Garden City district, which includes many landmarks such as Cairo University Medical School, Egyptian Medical Syndicate, Nahar Theater, Rose Al-Youssef Newspaper, and Qasr El Eyni Hospital.

=== Darih Saad Street ===
It is one of the streets in the Sayyidah Zainab district, named after the presence of the House of the Nation, where the Egyptian leader Saad Zaghloul was buried, and the mausoleum where he was buried was called Saad Zaghloul Mausoleum, so the street was named Darih Saad Street in Arabic.

=== Nasiriya Street ===
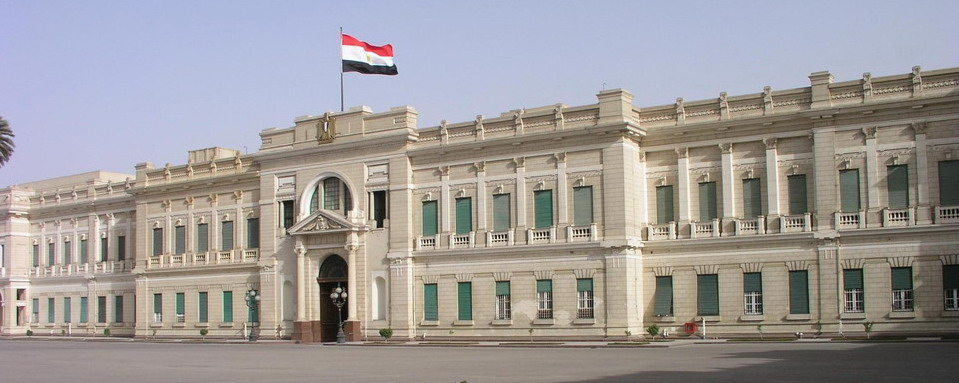
Abdeen Palace

It is one of the streets in the Sayyidah Zainab, and the reason for the name of this street is because there was a pond called Al-Birka Al-Nasiriya by Sultan Al-Nasir Muhammad bin Qalawun, which was surrounded by small houses, but with the construction of Abdeen Palace and the beginning of Khedive Ismail's reign, several state officials lived in it because of its proximity to Abdeen Palace, which was the seat of government at that time, it has many landmarks such as Ismaili Mosque, Ka'ab Al-Ahbar Mosque, Al-Sultan Hanafi Mosque.

=== Khairat Street ===
Located next to Nasiriya Street, it was named after Ubaydallah Khairat, who had a palace on this street, and is the grandfather of musician Omar Khairat.

=== Mohamed Ezz Al-Arab Street ===
It was formerly called Al-Mobtadian, starting from Qasr El-Aini Street to the areas of Nasiriya Street and Khairat Street, and its name is due to the presence of Al-Mobtadian Secondary School, which was originally a palace called Al-Bardisi. This palace was the Masafer Khana, which means that it was intended to receive guests from Egypt, then it was named Sheikh Ali Youssef Street in reference to Sheikh Ali Youssef, one of the pioneers of journalism in Egypt. Then it was named after Muhammad Ezz Al-Arab, a lawyer, while Sheikh Ali Youssef's name was given to a street in the Monira neighborhood in Sayyidah Zainab.

=== Al-Sadd Street ===
It is one of the longest streets in the district, and it is divided into two parts:

- The first is from the Tibi Bridge to Abu Al-Rish Square.
- The second from Abu Al-Rish Square to Al-Sayeda Zeinab Mosque, and the second half has been named Yusuf Sibai Street in honor of the assassinated journalist, while the name of the street is known to the general Egyptians as Al-Sadd Street, This street is very popular among Egyptians, especially during the month of Ramadan, lanterns are made to celebrate the month of Ramadan, from the last week of Shaaban until the first half of Ramadan, and a movie was made under its name Sahrea Al-Sadd starring Farouk Al-Fishawi.

== Notable people ==
- Writer Yahya Haqqi: He was born in Darb al-Mayda, behind the Sayyidah Zainab mosque.
- Actor Nour El-Sherif: Born in Sayyidah Zainab.
- Artist and musician Sayed Mekawy: Born in the Nasiriya District.
- Musician Omar Khairat: He was born on Khairat Street in the Sayyidah Zainab District.
- Hamada Imam: A football player at Zamalek Club, born in Mounira.
- Actress Huda El-Mufti: Born in Sayyidah Zainab.
- Actor Adel Imam: He lived in the Sayyidah Zainab.
