= Sayyida Zainab Mosque, Cairo =

Mosque in Cairo, Egypt

Sayyida Zaynab Mosque
- مَسْجِد ٱلسَّيِّدَة زَيْنَب
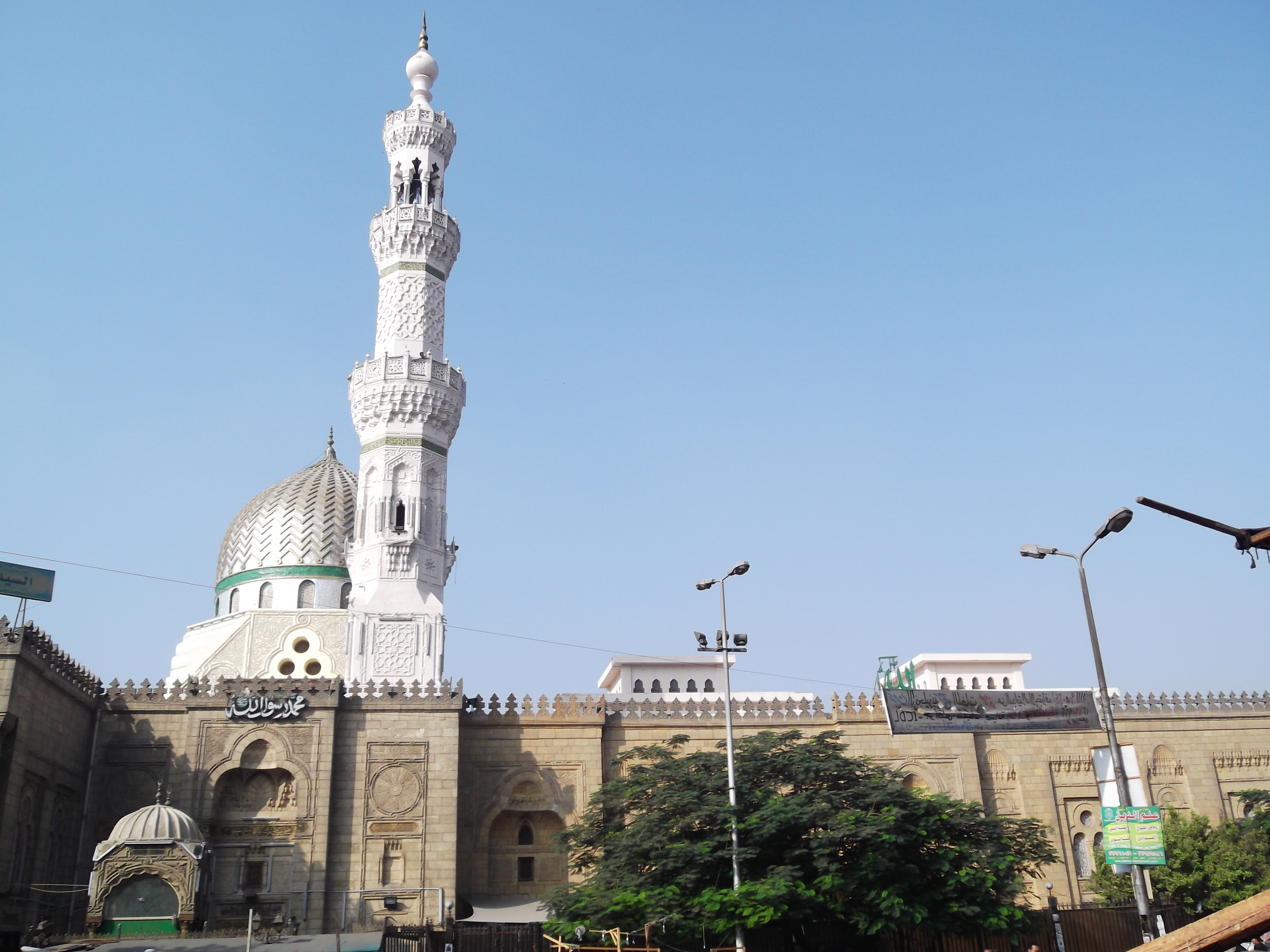

Religion
- Affiliation: Sunni Islam
- Ecclesiastical or organisational status: Mosque; Mausoleum
- Status: Active

Location
- Location: Saliba Street, Sayyidah Zainab District, Islamic Cairo
- Country: Egypt
- Interactive map of Sayyida Zaynab Mosque
- Coordinates: 30°1′54″N 31°14′31″E

Architecture
- Type: Mosque
- Style: Islamic; Neo-Mamluk
- Completed: unknown (original); 1547 (renovation); 1768 (renovation); 1940 (current structure)

Specifications
- Dome: 1
- Minaret: 1

The Sayyida Zaynab Mosque (Arabic: مَسْجِد ٱلسَّيِّدَة زَيْنَب, romanized: Masjid As-Sayyidah Zaynab) is a mosque and mausoleum located on Portsaid Street in the Sayyidah Zainab District of Islamic Cairo, Egypt. It is one of the largest and most important mosques of the city. It is centred on a shrine that is said to contain the tomb of Sayyidah Zaynab bint Ali, (Note: Another mosque in Damascus, Syria, is also said to contain the tomb of Sayyidah Zaynab.) one of the daughters of Ali, fourth caliph, and his first wife Fatima, daughter of the Islamic prophet Muhammad. She is considered one of the patron saints of Cairo.

== Location ==
The mosque is located in Sayyidah Zainab District of Cairo, where its name was taken from the name of the mosque. The mosque occupies the center of the neighborhood and there is Al-Sayyida Zaynab Square in front of the mosque. The square is one of the most famous and important squares in Cairo, and there are numerous restaurants and cafes packed with people especially during the breakfast and sahur time of the Islamic month of Ramadan. Zayn al-Abidin Street connects the mosque to the different major locations in Cairo.

== History ==
The mosque was considered built on top of the grave of Sayyida Zaynab the sister of Hasan and Husain. Some historians consider that Sayyida Zaynab was exiled to Egypt a few months after the Battle of Karbala, where she settled for nine months before her death, and she was buried at this site. As such, the location is considered one of the most notable places of Islamic history and the most popular tombs to visit among Sunnis and Isma'ili Shi'ites. However, many other people, primarily Twelver Shias, believe that Sayyida Zaynab was buried in Damascus, Syria, where the mosque of the same name is located today.

There is no accurate record of when the mosque was built over the grave of Sayyida Zaynab, and no historical references are currently available except for Ottoman Ali Pasha's order for renovation in 1547, and since then there were other renovations, including the one conducted by Amir Abdul Rahman in 1768 and the one in 1940 by the Ministry of Endowment which demolished the old building completely and built the current building. Henceforth, the mosque is not registered as an artifact of Islamic history. The mosque at the time consisted of seven corridors parallel to the wall of the qibla with a square dish covered with a dome. On the opposite side of the qibla wall is the mausoleum of Sayyida Zaynab, surrounded by a brass fence and topped by a tall dome. In 1969, the Ministry of Endowment doubled the area of the mosque.

In 2022, the Egyptian authorities commenced maintenance and renovation efforts at the mosque, culminating in a visit by President Abdel Fattah El-Sisi and Mufaddal Saifuddin on May 12, 2024, to mark its completion.

== See also ==
- Islam in Egypt
- List of mausoleums in Cairo
- List of mosques in Cairo
