= Zaynab bint Ali =

Daughter of Ali and Fatima (626–682)

Zaynab al-Kubra
- زَيْنَب الْكُبْرَىٰ
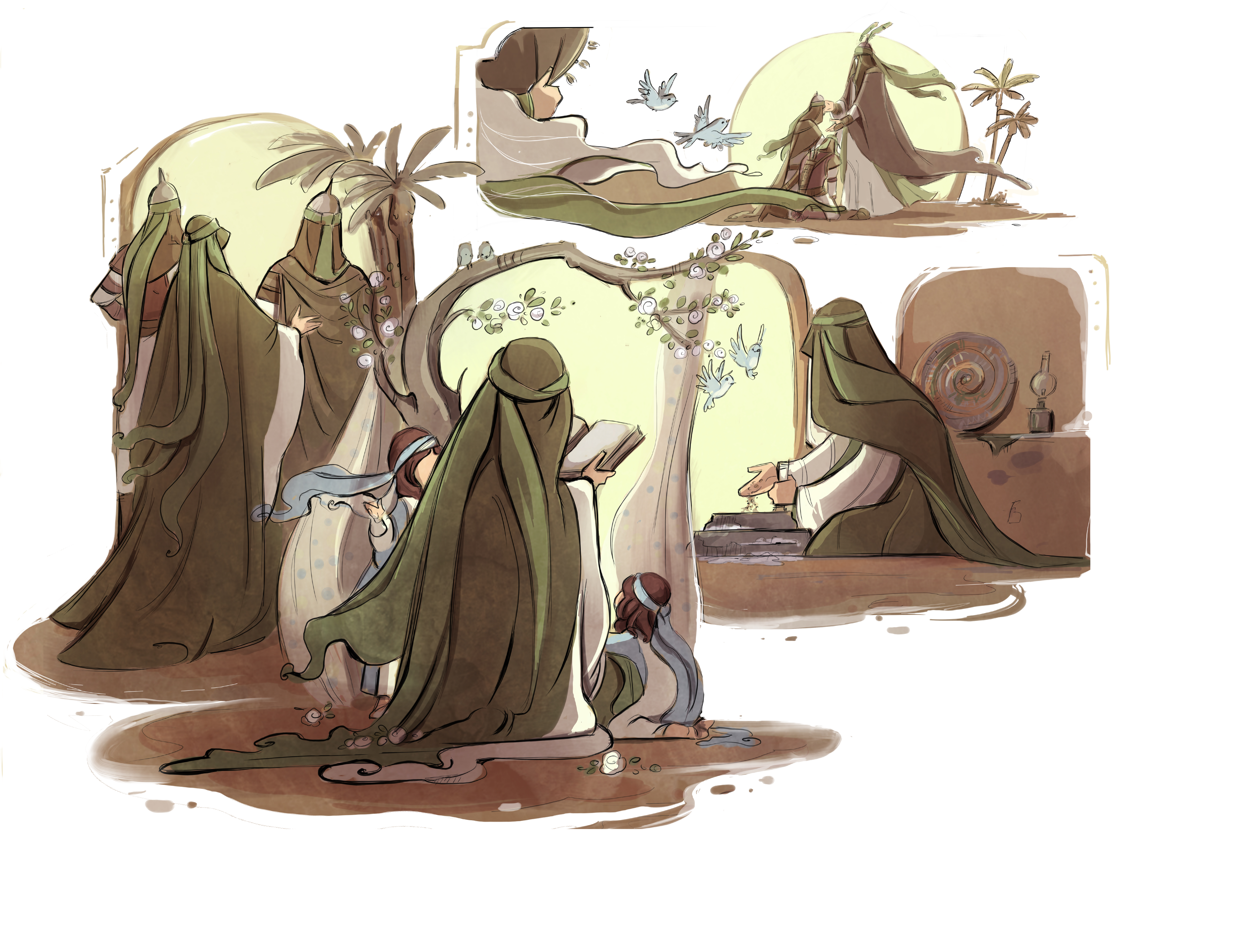
- Life of Zaynab bint Ali
- Born: 626 CE; Medina, First Islamic state
- Died: 682 CE; Damascus or Cairo, Umayyad Caliphate
- Resting place: Sayyidah Zainab Mosque, Damascus, or Sayyidah Zainab Mosque, Cairo
- Known for: Her role in the aftermath of the Battle of Karbala
- Spouse: Abd Allah ibn Ja'far
- Children: Awn; Muhammad; Ali; Abbas; Umm Kulthum
- Parents: Ali ibn Abi Talib (father); Fatima bint Muhammad (mother)
- Relatives: List: Muhammad (grandfather); Hasan (brother); Husayn (brother); Muhsin (brother); Umm Kulthum (sister); Ruqayyah (half sister); Fakhita (half sister); Abbas (half-brother); Hilal (half-brother)
- Family: Ahl al-Bayt

Zaynab bint Ali (Arabic: زَيْنَب بِنْت عَلِيّ, c. 626–682), commonly known as Zaynab al-Kubra, was a grand-daughter of the Islamic prophet Muhammad, and the eldest daughter of Ali and Fatima. She is best known for her role in the aftermath of the Battle of Karbala, in which her brother Husayn and most of her male relatives were massacred by the forces of the Umayyad caliph Yazid. Following the battle, Zaynab was among the survivors of Husayn's family who were taken captive by the Umayyad forces.

She played a prominent role in protecting the surviving members of the family and delivering speeches in Kufa and Damascus, condemning the brutal treatment of Husayn and his family. She is venerated particularly in Shia Islam, and the Sayyida Zaynab Mosque in Damascus is attributed as her burial site.

Her conduct after Karbala has made her an important symbol of courage, steadfastness, and resistance in Shia devotional literature and mourning traditions. She is considered to be a symbol of sacrifice, strength, and piety in Islam, and a role model for Muslim women, typifying courage, leadership, and defiance against oppression.

== Titles ==
The Arabic word zaynab literally means 'adornment of father'. She is also known as Zaynab al-Kubra (lit. 'the senior Zaynab') to distinguish her from her younger sister Umm Kulthum or Zaynab al-Sughra (lit. 'the junior Zaynab'). Another title of Zaynab is Aqilatu Bani Hashim (lit. 'the sage of the Bani Hashim'), where the word al-aqila literally means 'the secluded one' or 'pearl'. She is also recognized as Batalatu al-Karbala (lit. 'the heroine of Karbala') for her role in that event. Sometimes she is referred to as al-Sayyida (lit. 'the lady'), and in Egypt as al-Tahira (lit. 'the pure one') and Umm al-Yatama (lit. 'mother of the orphans').

== Birth and early life ==
Zaynab was the third child of Fatima and Ali ibn Abi Talib, and their eldest daughter. The former was the daughter of the Islamic prophet Muhammad, and the latter was his cousin. Ali is also recognized as the fourth Rashidun caliph (r. 656–661) and the first Shia imam. There is not much clarity about Zaynab's early life, and even the year of her birth is given variously by different sources as 4–6 AH (626–8 CE), or 9 (631). Shia Muslims celebrate her birthday annually on 5 Jumada al-Awwal. Her name was chosen by her grandfather Muhammad, who attributed the name to divine inspiration. When she was born, the angel Gabriel is said to have forewarned Muhammad about her difficult life. Muhammad was very fond of his granddaughter, reputedly saying that she resembled his late wife Khadija (d. 619). Shia sources also emphasize the intense devotion of the young Zaynab to her brother Husayn. Unlike her parents and her two brothers, namely, Hasan and Husayn, Zaynab is not among the Fourteen Infallibles in Twelver Shi'ism. As she was raised with and by infallibles, she is nevertheless believed to have had "minor infallibility" in Twelver Shi'ism.

As a young child, Zaynab might have foreseen her future trials: She is said to have seen in a dream that she was caught in a large tree amidst a storm. When the tree was uprooted by the strong winds, she grasped for branches and twigs, which also broke one after another, and she woke us as she began to fall. Muhammad told her that the tree, the branches, and the twigs represented her grandfather, parents, and brothers, respectively, who would all die before her.

== Death of Muhammad and Fatima (632) ==
Muhammad died in 632 and Zaynab thus lost her grandfather at an early age. As Muhammad's family prepared for the burial, a group of Muslims gathered at the Saqifa and appointed as his successor Abu Bakr, a senior companion. They did so in the absence of Muhammad's family and the majority of the Muhajirun (Meccan Muslims). Ali, Fatima, and some supporters did not recognize the caliphate of Abu Bakr, claiming that Muhammad had appointed Ali as his successor, referring to the Ghadir Khumm shortly before his death. Soon after the Saqifa affair, Umar, another companion of Muhammad, is known to have led an armed mob to Ali's residence and threatened to set the house on fire if Ali and his supporters did not pledge their allegiance to Abu Bakr. The confrontation then grew violent, but the mob retreated without securing Ali's pledge.

Fatima died in the same year, within six months of Muhammad's death, and at the age of about eighteen or twenty-seven. Shia Islam asserts that she miscarried her child and died from the injuries she suffered in an attack on her house, intended to subdue Ali, instigated by Abu Bakr and led by his aide Umar. These claims are rejected by Sunni Muslims, who believe that Fatima died from grief after the death of Muhammad and that her child died in infancy of natural causes. Zaynab thus lost her mother at the age of about five. According to the Sunni author A. Abd al-Rahman (d. 1998), Fatima on her deathbed entrusted Zaynab with a white garment for Husayn to wear as his shroud (kafan) when leaving for the battlefield in Karbala.

== Marriage and family life ==
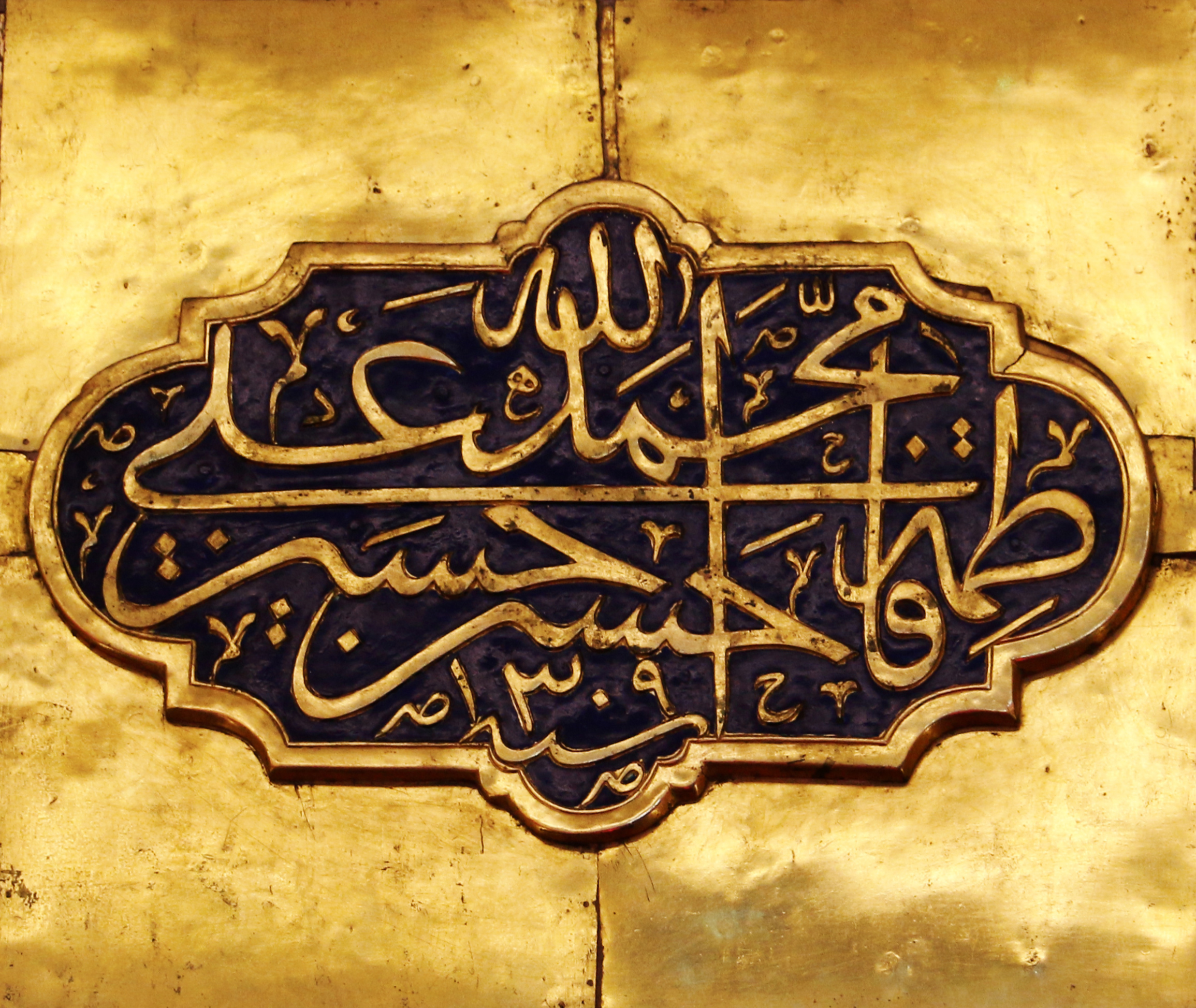
Zaynab's grandfather, parents, and two brothers are considered infallible in Shia Islam. Their names are inscribed on this plaque in the Al-Abbas Shrine in Karbala.

Zaynab married her paternal cousin Abd Allah, whose father Ja'far al-Tayyar ibn Abi Talib was Muhammad's cousin and a prominent early Muslim, who was killed in the Battle of Mu'ta (629) against the Byzantines. Abd Allah was a narrator of prophetic hadiths, thirteen of which appear in the canonical Sunni collection Musnad Ibn Hanbal. Abd Allah also narrated hadiths from the Shia imams and might have lived long enough to be a companion to the Shia imam Muhammad al-Baqir (d. 732), although this last claim is not reported by the prominent Shia scholar Shaykh Tusi (d. 1067). Abd Allah was wealthy and known for his generosity, even though he is said to have lived modestly. Accordingly, the marriage ceremony of Zaynab and Abd Allah is described as a simple affair. The Shia author M. Eshtehardi writes that Zaynab married Abd Allah on the condition that she would be allowed to daily visit her brother Husayn and travel with him.

The couple had four sons, named Ali, Awn, Abbas, and Muhammad. They also had a daughter named Umm Kulthum. The Islamicist J. Esposito differs here, as he suggests that the couple had three sons and two daughters, without naming them. Awn and Muhammad were killed in the Battle of Karbala, and there is no information about Abbas, but Zaynab's lineage continued through Ali, also known as Ali al-Zaynabi.

== Religious learning and eloquence ==
For her knowledge of prophetic hadiths, Muhammad's prominent cousin Ibn Abbas (d. c. 687) referred to Zaynab as Aqilatu Bani Hashim (lit. 'the sage of the Bani Hashim'). Her reputation among hadith scholars was apparently such that they cited Ali as the 'father of Zaynab' during the Umayyad's ban on publicly speaking about Ali. She also taught Quranic exegesis to women in her hometown of Medina, and later in Kufa, and was likely trained in this subject by her father Ali, whom the Islamicist T. Qutbuddin praises as "the most learned of [Islamic] sages."

Zaynab is described as eloquent, reputedly reminding her listeners of her father Ali. A sermon attributed to Zaynab after the Battle of Karbala is recorded by the Muslim historian Ibn Abi Tahir Tayfur (d. 893) in his Balaghat al-nisa', which is an anthology of eloquent speeches by women. The book also contains another sermon, which the author attributes to Zaynab's sister Umm Kulthum. Nevertheless, this second speech has also been attributed to Zaynab by most later authors, including the Shia scholar Ibn A'tham. Qutbuddin considers this latter attribution a strong possibility.

== Death of Ali (661) ==
Ali was elected caliph in 656, after which he established himself in Kufa as his de facto capital in 656–657. Zaynab and Abd Allah accompanied Ali to Kufa. There he was assassinated during the morning prayer at the Mosque of Kufa in January 661, which coincided with Ramadan, the month of fasting in Islam. The biographical al-Irshad, authored by the prominent Shia scholar al-Mufid (d. 1022), details that Ali spent his last night as Zaynab's guest for Iftar and Suhur, and that the wounded Ali was brought back to her house after the attack. Soon after Ali's death, his eldest son Hasan was elected caliph in Kufa, but later abdicated in favor of Mu'awiya (r. 661–680) in August 661, possibly due to the latter's overwhelming military superiority and the weak support of the Iraqis for war. The peace treaty between Hasan and Mu'awiya stipulated that the latter should not appoint a successor.

== Death of Hasan (670) ==
Hasan returned to Medina after his abdication, accompanied by his family, where he kept aloof from politics in compliance with the peace treaty with Mu'awiya. Early sources are nearly unanimous that Hasan was later poisoned at the instigation of Mu'awiya in 669, possibly to pave the way for the succession of his son Yazid (r. 680–683). Zaynab is said to have attended her brother Hasan in his final days. Hasan was thus succeeded as the head of Muhammad's family by his brother Husayn, who nevertheless upheld the treaty with Mu'awiya.

== Activities in 680 CE ==
=== After the accession of Yazid (680) ===
Mu'awiya designated his son Yazid as his successor in 676, and his nomination was met with resistance from the sons of Muhammad's prominent companions, including Husayn ibn Ali. On Mu'awiya's death and Yazid's succession in 680, the latter instructed the governor of Medina to secure Husayn's pledge of allegiance by force. Husayn thus left Medina for Mecca at night to avoid recognizing Yazid as the caliph. He was accompanied by some relatives, including Zaynab and two of her sons, namely, Awn and Muhammad.

Zaynab's husband Abd Allah did not accompany Husayn even though he was sympathetic to Husayn's cause, according to the Sunni historian al-Tabari (d. 923). Eshtehardi suggests that Abd Allah's absence must have been due to his poor health or old age and that sending his sons with Husayn was an indication of his support. In contrast, Abd al-Rahman writes that Zaynab must have divorced Abd Allah before leaving Medina and that he later married Zaynab's sister Umm Kulthum, although her views have been criticized by some. As the husband's permission is necessary in such cases under Islamic laws, some have instead suggested that a condition of her marriage to Abd Allah was that Zaynab could accompany Husayn in all his travels, or specifically to Karbala.

=== Journey towards Karbala (680) ===
After receiving letters of support from some Kufans, whose intentions were confirmed by his cousin Muslim ibn Aqil, Husayn left Mecca for Kufa on 10 or 12 September 680, accompanied by some relatives and supporters. A tradition attributed to Husayn in al-Irshad describes his goal as fighting the tyranny of Yazid, even though it would cost his life. Husayn similarly wrote in his will for his half-brother Ibn Hanafiyya that he had not set out to seek "corruption or oppression" but rather to "enjoin what is right and forbid what is wrong." At any rate, on their way to Kufa, Husayn's small caravan was intercepted by Yazid's army and forced to camp in the desert land of Karbala on 2 Muharram 61 (2 October 680) away from water and fortifications. The promised Kufan support did not materialize as the new governor of Kufa, Ubayd Allah ibn Ziyad (d. 686), killed the envoy of Husayn and intimidated Kufan tribal chiefs.

=== Water shortage and Negotiations ===
On 7 Muharram, acting on orders of Ibn Ziyad, the Umayyad commander Umar ibn Sa'd (d. 686) cut off Husayn's access to the Euphrates river. Husayn's half-brother Abbas ibn Ali and his men were nonetheless able to bring back some water to Husayn's camp in a night sortie. Despite this attempt, Husayn's camp suffered from thirst and hunger during the siege. Karbala has a hot desert climate.

Ibn Sa'd was instructed by Ibn Ziyad not to let Husayn leave unless he pledged his allegiance to Yazid. Husayn did not submit to Yazid, but negotiated with Ibn Ziyad through Ibn Sa'd to be allowed to retreat and avoid bloodshed. The governor did not relent, however, and finally ordered Ibn Sa'd to fight, kill, and disfigure Husayn and his supporters unless they pledged allegiance to Yazid, in which case their fate would be decided later.

=== Tasu'a (9 Muharram) ===
At the request of Husayn, the confrontation was delayed on Tasu'a until the following day. Husayn then beseeched his followers in a speech to leave him and not risk their lives, but nearly all those present stayed with him until the end. Husayn and his companions spent that night praying and reading the Quran, as reported by most maqatil works. On this night, Husayn revived and consoled Zaynab who had fainted in despair from the prospect of his imminent death. According to a common Karbala narrative, Zaynab also reminded her half-brother Abbas of their father's wish for the latter to be the reserves of Karbala, and to be to Husayn as Ali was to Muhammad. This Abbas confirmed and swore to do.

=== Ashura (10 Muharram) ===
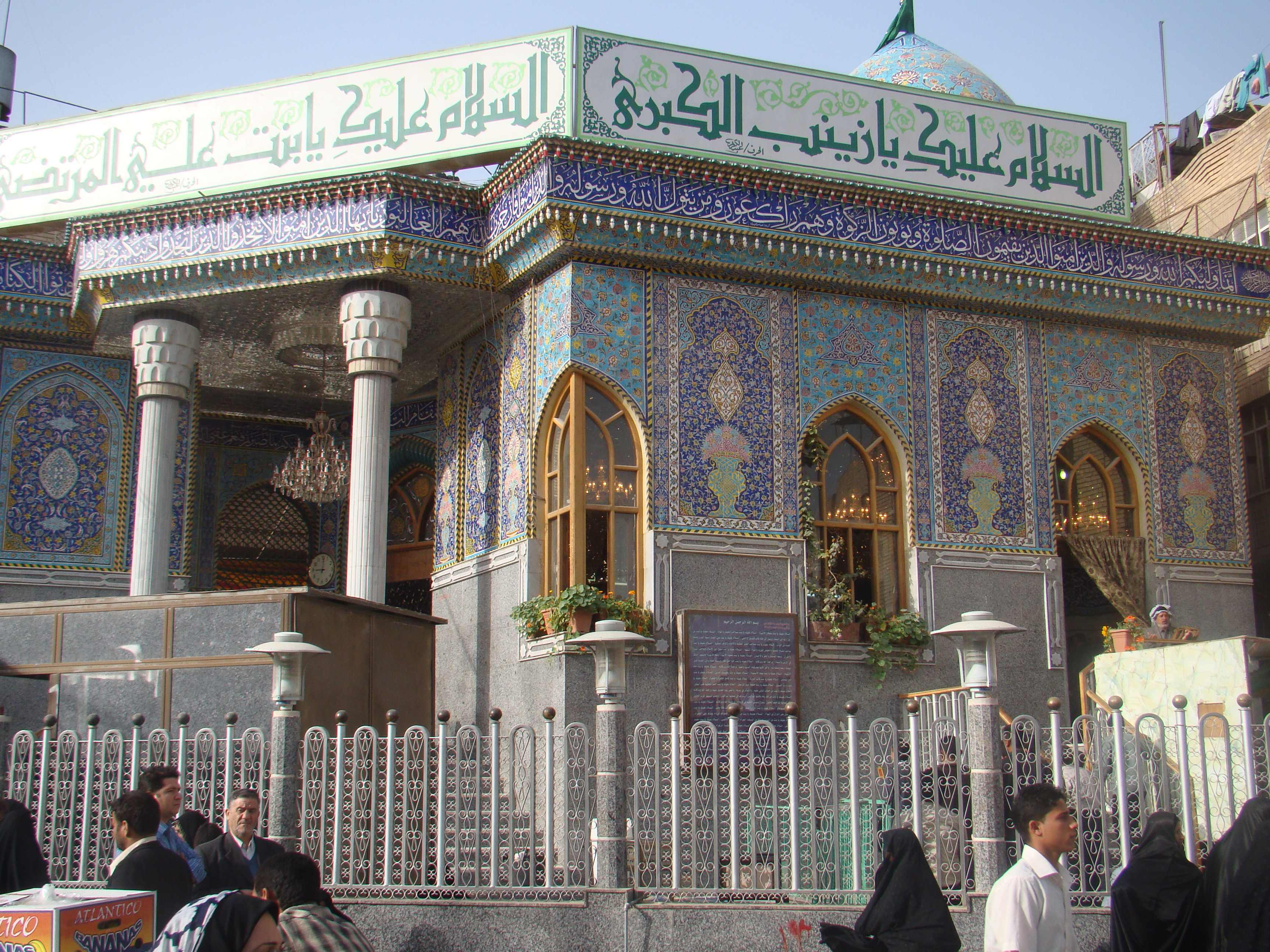
Zaynab reputedly witnessed the Battle of Karbala unfold from al-Tall al-Zaynabiyya.

On the morning of Ashura, Husayn organized his supporters, some seventy-two men, and then spoke to the enemy lines and asked them why they considered it lawful to kill Muhammad's grandson. The Umayyad commander al-Hurr ibn Yazid al-Tamimi defected to Husayn's side, probably after this speech. The Umayyad army then showered the camp with arrows, thus commencing the battle which lasted from morning till sunset and consisted of incidents of single combat, skirmishes, assaults, and retreats. The army also set Husayn's tents on fire, although al-Tabari believes that the tent of Husayn's wives (and children) was spared, adding that the Umayyad commander Shamir ibn Dhi al-Jawshan was dissuaded by other soldiers from setting that tent aflame.

Companions of Husayn all perished by the early afternoon and were followed by the Banu Hashim, including two sons of Husayn, three sons of Hasan, and the two sons of Zaynab present at Karbala, whom she is said to have encouraged to fight. In Shia view, Zaynab's motive in sacrificing her children was the survival of (Shia) Islam, even more so than her love for Husayn. Zaynab also consoled the families of the fallen warriors throughout the day, and cared for the wounded. She is said to have witnessed the battle from a platform (tall) made of saddles, but have remained in her tent when it was the turn of her sons to fight. By one account, she once rushed to the battlefield to help but was called back by Husayn who instructed her to care for those left behind. Similarly, al-Tabari reports that Zaynab ran to the battlefield crying and threw herself on her fallen nephew Ali al-Akbar ibn Husayn when the latter was killed in the fight. Husayn walked her back to the camp.

==== Death of Husayn ====
When Husayn's last remaining warrior fell, the Umayyad army converged on the lone imam, who nevertheless fought until the end. Before he left for the battlefield one last time, a common Karbala narrative holds that Zaynab kissed Husayn on behalf of their mother Fatima to fulfill her wish, and that Husayn asked Zaynab not to lament after his imminent death. When the wounded Husayn finally fell from his horse and was surrounded, Zaynab is said to have run towards him, beseeching Ibn Sa'd to spare her brother's life. The Umayyad commander ignored her request.

Husayn's family thus witnessed as he was repeatedly stabbed and slashed by the Umayyad soldiers. He was then decapitated by Shamir or Sinan ibn Anas, or by Khawali ibn Yazid Asbahi, although common accounts of Karbala hold Shamir responsible for this. Some accounts add that Zaynab had already returned to the camp, urged by the dying Husayn, and did not witness the beheading of her brother, but al-Tabari differs here. Modern Karbala narratives emphasize that Zaynab did not break down as she witnessed the murder of her brother, following Husayn's earlier wishes. Standing over Husayn's body, she reputedly uttered, "O God! Accept from us this offering," to the bewilderment of the enemy soldiers.

=== Immediate aftermath ===
After the death of Husayn, Umayyad soldiers stole his garments and personal belongings, pillaged his camp, and severed the heads of his fallen companions, which they then raised on spears for display. There are also reports of children's deaths during the Umayyad stampede. Acting upon earlier orders of Ibn Ziyad, the body of Husayn was then trampled, apparently by ten horsemen who volunteered to "inflict this final indignity" upon him. Some seventy-two bodies of Husayn and his companions were later buried by the Banu Asad men of the nearby al-Ghadiriyya village. The women and children were taken captive, including Zaynab and Umm Kulthum. Among the captives was also Husayn's only surviving son Ali, who had been too ill to fight. Known in Shia Islam by the honorific titles al-Sajjad and Zayn al-Abidin, Ali ibn al-Husayn was later recognized as the fourth of the Twelve Imams. It was through him that the line of Shia imams continued. Shamir attempted to kill Ali too, but Zaynab successfully pleaded to him to spare his life, saying that she had to be killed first. The captives mourned Husayn shortly after the battle.

=== Captives in Kufa ===
The captives were marched back to Kufa, arriving there on 12 Muharram. There are reports that the women were dishonored and ogled along the way, and that the captives were humiliated, carried on unsaddled camels, and, according to al-Tabari, bound in ropes and shackles. The captives were then paraded in shackles and unveiled around the city alongside the heads of Husayn and his companions on spears. The captives likely regarded Zaynab as their leader.

==== Zaynab's speech in Kufa ====
Ibn Tayfur records two speeches about Karbala in his Balaghat al-nisa', one attributed to Umm Kulthum in the market of Kufa, and the other ascribed to Zaynab in the court of Yazid in Damascus. Most Shia authors, however, have later attributed both sermons to Zaynab, which Qutbuddin considers highly likely. Ibn Tayfur writes that the Kufans wailed and wept when they saw Muhammad's family in captivity. Zaynab (or Umm Kulthum) then addressed the crowd and chastised them for their role in Husayn's death and recounted the events of Karbala.

==== Court of Ibn Ziyad ====
As reported by al-Tabari and al-Mufid, the captives were then presented to Ibn Ziyad, who boasted to Zaynab about killing Husayn and her relatives. She countered by reminding him of the verse of purification (33:33) and the elevated status of Muhammad's family in the Quran, adding that murder was preordained for Husayn and his supporters, and that God would soon judge between them and Ibn Ziyad. Her response angered the governor who nevertheless restrained himself after his men told him that a woman cannot be blamed for what she says. Ibn Ziyad also ordered the execution of Ali ibn Husayn but was dissuaded when Zaynab protected her nephew and asked to be killed before him, as reported by the early historians Abu Mikhnaf (d. 773–774), Ibn Sa'd (d. 845), and al-Tabari. After releasing the rest, Ibn Ziyad imprisoned the Hashimite captives for a while and then sent them to Damascus.

=== Journey to Damascus ===
The caravan's route to Damascus is uncertain, but some say that they took the desert path. The tenth-century Sunni scholar al-Khwarazmi in his al-Maqtal writes that the captives were taken from "village to village" and displayed, while the Shia-leaning historian al-Ya'qubi (d. 897–898) similarly reports that a letter of Ibn Abbas later reprimanded Yazid for parading the women of Muhammad's family from Kufa to Damascus to show his victory, adding that he deemed this to be worse than the massacre of Husayn and his relatives.

=== Captives in Damascus ===
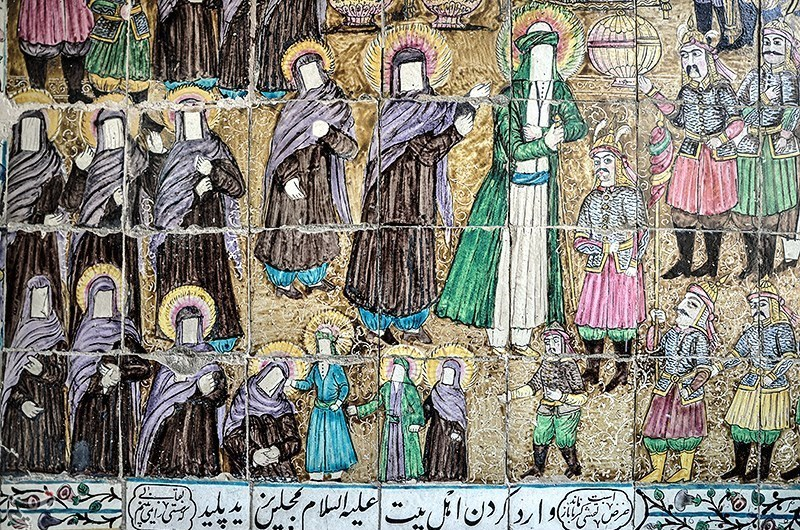
A tilework inside Mu'awin ul-Mulk in Kermanshah, Iran, depicting the captives in the court of Yazid.

The captives were paraded in the streets of Damascus, and then imprisoned for a while. When they were brought to the caliph, the Islamicist L. Veccia Vaglieri (d. 1989) writes that Yazid treated them kindly after an initial harsh interview and regretted the conduct of his governor, even saying that he would have pardoned Husayn if he was alive. Similar accounts are offered by the historians W. Madelung (d. 2023) and H. Halm. By contrast, the Islamicist M. Momen believes that Yazid initially treated the captives harshly but later released them as the public opinion began to sway in their favor and he feared unrest in his territory. Views of this kind are expressed by multiple authors, including Esposito, R. Osman, K. Aghaie, D. Pinault, H. Munson, and the Shia scholar M.H. Tabatabai (d. 1981). In particular, the Sunni historian Ibn Kathir (d. 1373) writes that Yazid did not reprimand his governor in the wake of the massacre, which does not suggest remorse on his part to the Islamicist H.M. Jafri (d. 2019). Jafri adds that the claims of remorse also contradict the earlier orders of Yazid for his governor to either exact homage from Husayn or kill him.

An alternative account is presented by the Shia scholar Tabarsi (d. 1153) and by Abu Mikhnaf. They write that the captives were brought in a ceremony to the caliph, who recited poetry and gloated about avenging his pagan relatives killed in the Battle of Badr (624). By some accounts, Yazid also dishonored the severed head of Husayn with blows from a cane, although this last episode is instead sometimes attributed to Ibn Ziyad, including in the account given by Veccia Vaglieri in which a respectful Yazid blames his governor for killing Husayn. Recounting this last account, Madelung suggests that early (Sunni) sources tend to exonerate the caliph at the cost of Ibn Ziyad. Madelung then argues that the prime responsibility for killing Husayn rests with Yazid.

==== Zaynab's speech in Damascus ====
Balaghat al-nisa' attributes to Zaynab a speech in the court of Yazid, where she is said to have interrupted the caliph's insults and addressed his court harshly, lamenting Husayn, castigating Yazid, and defending the family of Muhammad. In the sermon, the caliph is addressed as "the son of al-tulaqa'," where this last word (lit. 'freedmen') is an Islamic reference to those who were pardoned by Muhammad upon his victorious return to Mecca. Yazid is then asked in the sermon if it is just to keep his women guarded and parade the daughters of Muhammad in the streets. As with the Kufa speech, this Damascus sermon is also infused with several Quranic references. For instance, Yazid's victory is called temporary in this sermon, his efforts futile, and his shame eternal. This is coupled with verse 3:179, "Let not disbelievers think that our respite is a good thing. Indeed, we give them respite so that they may increase in trespass, and a shameful punishment awaits them," and verse 11:18, "The curse of God be upon the oppressor," among others.

==== Other episodes ====
Reports by al-Tabari and the Shia scholar Ibn Babawayh (d. c. 923) indicate that a Syrian at one point asked the caliph to give her a daughter of Husayn as a slave but Zaynab angrily prevented this. The Shia jurist Mughniyya (d. 1979) writes that Zaynab was asked sarcastically in Damascus how she perceived the events of Karbala, to which she replied, "I have not seen anything except that it was beautiful" (ma ra'aytu illa jamila). For Mughniyya, this response in that hostile environment highlights Zaynab's political strength and vision. A young child of Husayn is said to have died in Damascus, often identified as Sakina, or Ruqayya. The Karbala narrative emphasizes her suffering and death in captivity. In Damascus, the captives continued to mourn Husayn, possibly joined by some women from Yazid's court.

== Later life in Medina ==
The captives were eventually freed. They were allowed to return to Medina, or escorted back there. By some accounts, their caravan returned via Karbala, where they halted to mourn their dead. According to a common Karbala narrative, the family of Muhammad was assisted in this journey by a man named Bashir, who was generously compensated by Zaynab and others from the little that was left after the looting on Ashura. Sunni sources report Yazid's remorse for the massacre and his compensation for the property plundered by his soldiers, while Shia authorities contend that it was Zaynab's activism that swayed some in Yazid's court, especially his women, and thus compelled the caliph to disassociate himself from the massacre and blame his governor. Similar views are expressed by some contemporary authors.

== Death and shrines ==
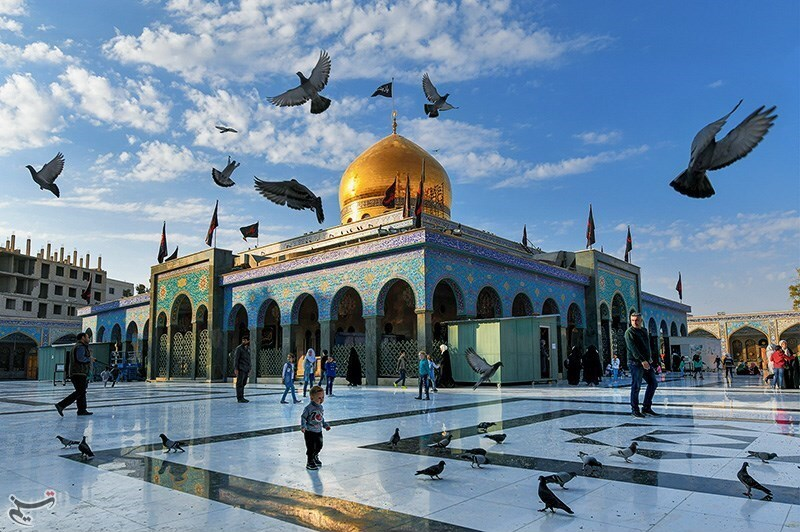
Sayyidah Zaynab Mosque, Damascus

Zaynab died in 682 at the age of about fifty-six, not long after returning to Medina from Damascus. Alternatively, the historian L. Adamec (d. 2019) places her death in the year 681. Shias annually commemorate her death on the most frequently cited date, that is, 15 Rajab. Other reported dates are 11 and 21 of Jumadi al-Thani, 24 Safar, and 16 Dhu al-Hijja.

Little is known about Zaynab's life after returning to Medina, though the silence of al-Tabari about it suggests that she was probably not involved with the nearby uprising of Abd-Allah ibn al-Zubayr. Some reports state that she died in Medina, others say that she travelled with her husband to his Syrian estates, where she died, and yet other sources write that she was exiled, possibly to Egypt, for publicizing Karbala. Her burial place is therefore uncertain, with claims made both for Sayyidah Zaynab Mosque in the suburbs of Damascus and another mosque at the heart of Cairo with the same name. While al-Tabari places her grave in Cairo and the Shia scholar Muhsin al-Amin (d. 1952) considers Damascus unlikely, the only key evidence offered in favor of Cairo is the existence of the shrine itself, which officially dates back to the third century AH, supplemented by the testimonies of travellers and notables who lived at least two centuries after Zaynab. The shrines in Damascus and Cairo are both destinations for Muslim pilgrimage, the former often visited by Shias and the latter by Sunnis.

=== Ritual mourning ===
Following the precedents set by Zaynab and the Shia imams, Shia Muslims commemorate the Karbala events throughout the months of Muharram and Safar, particularly during the first ten days of Muharram, culminating on Ashura with processions in major Shia cities. The main component of ritual ceremonies (majalis, sing. majlis) is the emotional narration of the stories of Karbala, intended to raise sympathy and move the audience to tears. It is in these ceremonies that Zaynab and other women of Karbala are also commemorated.

== Historical impact ==
=== Role model ===
Qutbuddin considers Zaynab a role model for Muslim women and a symbol of "courage, fortitude, leadership, eloquence, devotion, and faith." This view is common, and female Muslim activists have at times cited what they perceived as the steadfast stance of Zaynab against tyranny and oppression, particularly in the recent histories of Iran and Lebanon. Zaynab's birthday is celebrated as Nurses Day in Iran, possibly because she cared for the wounded in Karbala.

=== Messenger of Karbala ===
Historically, Karbala served to crystallize the Shia community into a distinct sect and remains an integral part of their religious identity to date. Karbala is perhaps the single most important episode in the history of Shia, where it is viewed as the ultimate struggle of justice and truth against oppression and falsehood, a righteous struggle (jihad) in which Husayn offered all that was dear to him for the cause of God. In this context, Zaynab has been described as Husayn's partner in his jihad, and the woman whose activism transformed Karbala from a tragedy to a victory. Without her "jihad of words," Karbala may have been forgotten.

== Gallery ==
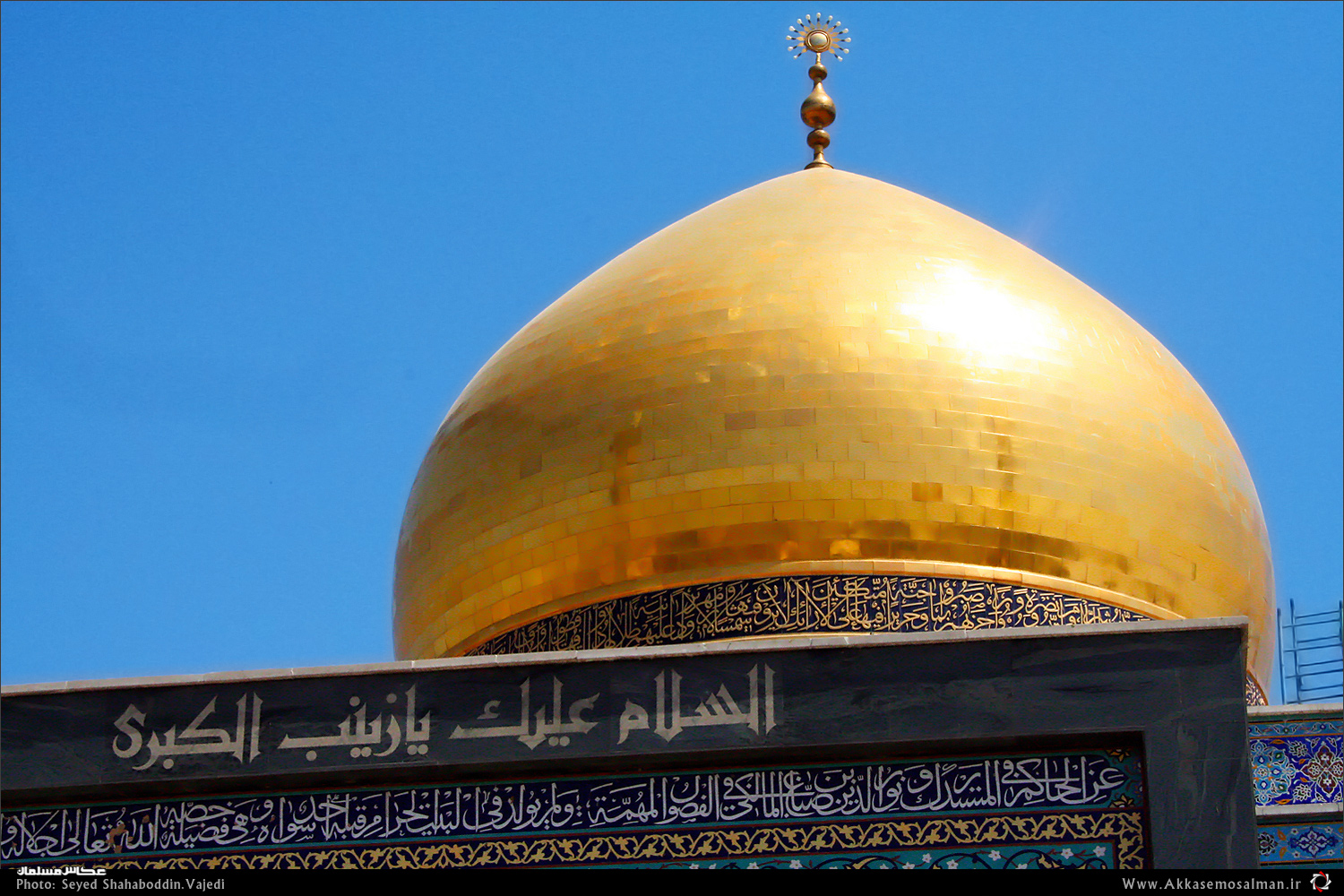
Sayyidah Zainab Mosque, Damascus

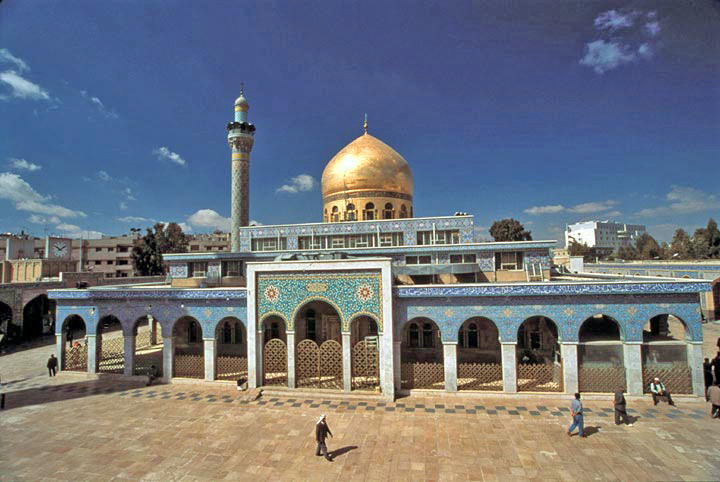
Damascus

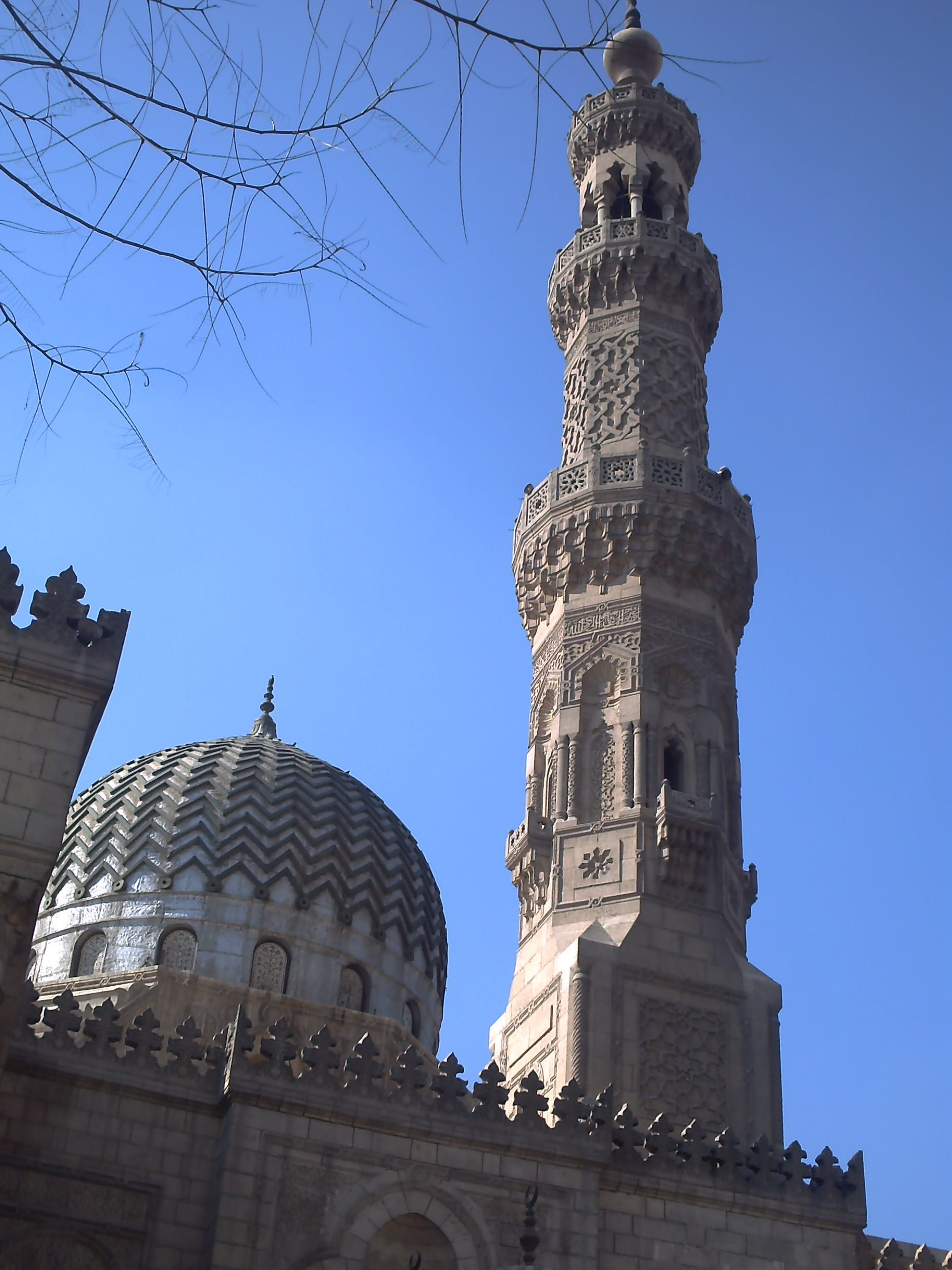
Sayyidah Zainab Mosque, Cairo

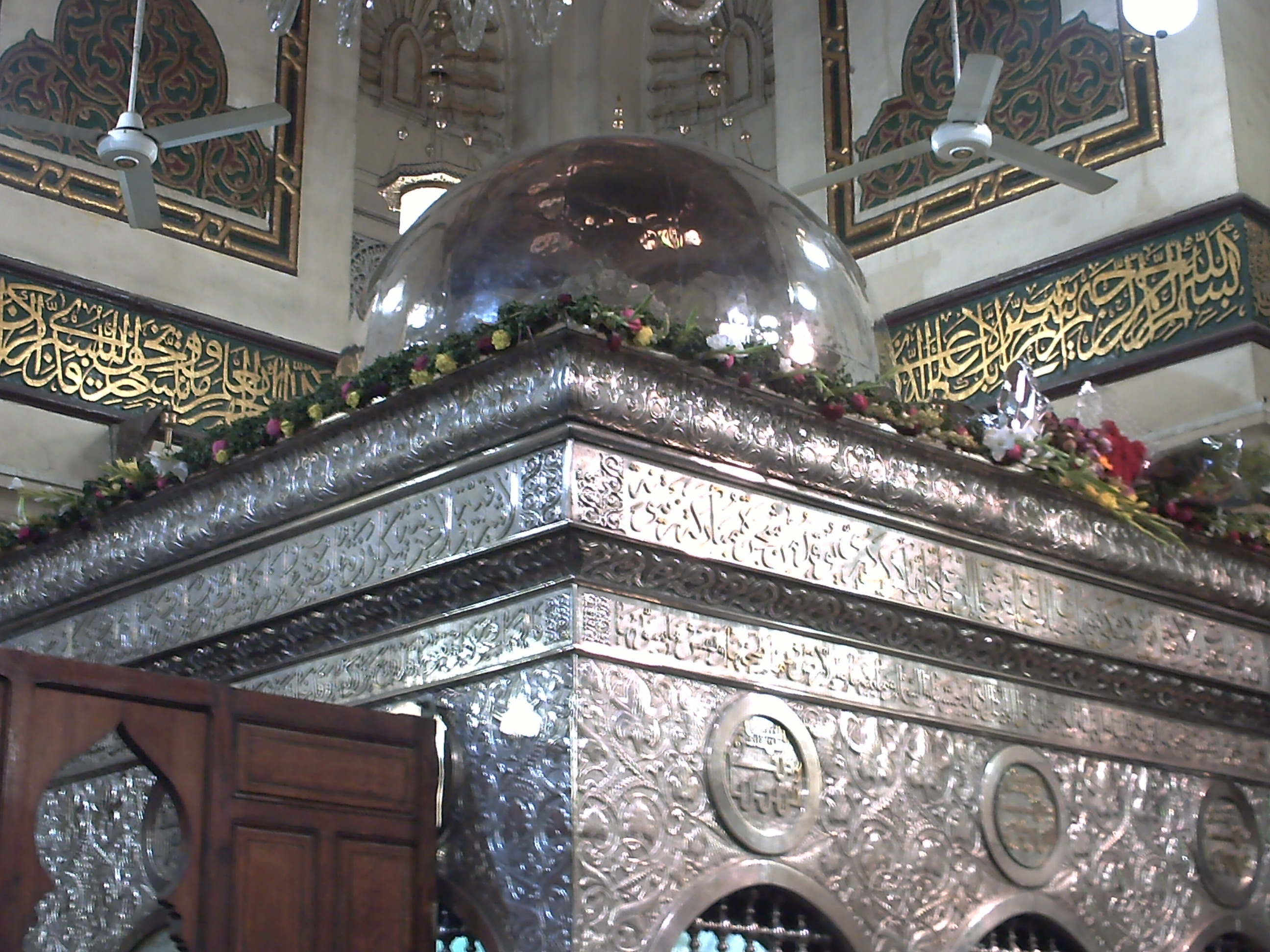
Cairo

== See also ==
- Tasu'a
- Ashura
- Arba'in
- Al-Tall al-Zaynabiyya
- Sayyidah Zainab District

== Sources ==
- Abbas, H. (2021). The Prophet's Heir: The life of Ali ibn Abi Talib. Yale University Press. ISBN 9780300252057.
- Abu Zahra, N. (1997). The Pure and Powerful: Studies in Contemporary Muslim Society. Ithaca Press. ISBN 0863722695.
- Adamec, L.W. (2017). Historical Dictionary of Islam (Third ed.). Rowman & Littlefield. ISBN 9781442277236.
- Adibzadeh, S. (2013). The Journey of Beauty Towards Perfection: Zaynab Bint 'Alī Ibn Abī Tālib and the Model of Human Changes Towards Developing Attributes of Walīyat Allāh and al-Insān al-Kāmil (Thesis). Temple University. ProQuest 1416413849.
- Aghaie, K.S. (2004a). "Ta'ziya (Ta'ziyeh)". In Martin, R.C. (ed.). Encyclopedia of Islam and the Muslim World. Vol. 2. Macmillan Reference USA. p. 691. ISBN 0028656059.
- Aghaie, K.S. (2004b). The Martyrs of Karbala: Shi'i Symbols and Rituals in Modern Iran. University of Washington Press. ISBN 0295984481.
- Aghaie, K.S. (2005). "Introduction". In Aghaie, K.S. (ed.). The Women of Karbala: Ritual Performance and Symbolic Discourses in Modern Shi'i Islam. University of Texas Press. ISBN 9780292709591.
- Amir-Moezzi, M.A. (2014). "Ghadīr Khumm". In Fleet, K.; Krämer, G.; Matringe, D.; Nawas, J.; Rowson, E. (eds.). Encyclopaedia of Islam (Third ed.). doi:10.1163/1573-3912_ei3_COM_27419. ISBN 9789004269613.
- Aslan, R. (2005). No god but God: The Origins and Evolution of Islam. Random House. ISBN 1588364453.
- Bahramian, A.; Bulookbashi, Ali A. (2015). "Al-'Abbās b. 'Alī". In Madelung, W.; Daftary, F. (eds.). Encyclopaedia Islamica. Translated by Negahban, F. doi:10.1163/1875-9831_isla_COM_0009.
- Blomfield, B. (2010). "From Ritual to Redemption: Worldview of Shi'a Muslim Women in Southern California". In Kassam, Z.R. (ed.). Women and Islam. ABC-CLIO. pp. 303–324. ISBN 9780313082740.
- Buehler, A.F. (2014). "Fatima (d. 632)". In Fitzpatrick, Coeli; Walker, A.H. (eds.). Muhammad in History, Thought, and Culture: An Encyclopaedia of the Prophet of God. Vol. 1. ABC-CLIO. pp. 182–187. ISBN 9781610691789.
- Calmard, J. (1982). "'Abbās b. 'Alī b. Abū Ṭāleb". Encyclopaedia Iranica. Vol. I/1. pp. 77–79. ISSN 2330-4804.
- Cortese, D.; Calderini, S. (2006). Women and the Fatimids in the World of Islam (First ed.). Edinburgh University Press. ISBN 9780748626298.
- Daftary, F. (2013). A History of Shi'i Islam. I.B. Tauris. ISBN 9780857723338.
- Deeb, L. (2006). An Enchanted Modern: Gender and Public Piety in Shi'i Lebanon. Princeton University Press. ISBN 9780691124216.
- Donner, F.M. (2010). Muhammad and the Believers: At the Origins of Islam. Harvard University Press. ISBN 9780674064140.
- D'Souza, D. (1998). "The Figure of Zaynab in Shi'i Devotional Life". In Singh, D.E. (ed.). Spiritual Traditions: Essential Visions for Living. United Theological College. pp. 201–225. ISBN 9788172144616.
- Esposito, J.L. (2003). The Oxford Dictionary of Islam. Oxford University Press. ISBN 0195125584.
- Esposito, J.L., ed. (2022). "Zaynab". The Islamic World: Past and Present. Oxford Reference. Oxford University Press. ISBN 9780197669471.
- Fedele, V. (2018). "Fatima (605/15–632 CE)". In de-Gaia, S. (ed.). Encyclopedia of Women in World Religions. ABC-CLIO. p. 56. ISBN 9781440848506.
- Flaskerud, I. (2005). "'Oh, My Heart Is Sad. It Is Moharram, the Month of Zaynab' The Role of Aesthetics and Women's Mourning Ceremonies in Shiraz". In Aghaie, K.S. (ed.). The Women of Karbala: Ritual Performance and Symbolic Discourses in Modern Shi'i Islam. University of Texas Press. pp. 65–92. ISBN 9780292709591.
- Gleave, R.M. (2008). "'Alī b. Abī Ṭālib". In Fleet, K.; Krämer, G.; Matringe, D.; Nawas, J.; Stewart, D.J. (eds.). Encyclopaedia of Islam (Third ed.). doi:10.1163/1573-3912_ei3_COM_26324. ISBN 9789004171374.
- Haider, N. (2014). Shi'i Islam: An Introduction. Cambridge University Press. ISBN 9781107031432.
- Halm, H. (1999). Shi'a Islam: From Religion to Revolution. Markus Wiener Publishers. ISBN 1558761349.
- Hamdar, A. (2009). "Jihad of words: Gender and contemporary Karbala narratives". The Yearbook of English Studies. 39 (1): 84–100. doi:10.1353/yes.2009.0016.
- Hazleton, L. (2009). After the Prophet: The Epic Story of the Shia-Sunni Split in Islam. Doubleday. ISBN 9780385532099.
- Hawting, G.R. (2000). The First Dynasty of Islam: The Umayyad Caliphate AD 661–750 (Second ed.). Routledge. ISBN 0415240735.
- Hulmes, E.D.A. (2008). "al-Hasan ibn 'Ali ibn Abi Talib (c. AD 625–69)". In Netton, I.R. (ed.). Encyclopaedia of Islamic Civilisation and Religion. Routledge. pp. 218–219. ISBN 9780700715886.
- Hyder, S.A. (2006). Reliving Karbala: Martyrdom in South Asian Memory. Oxford University Press. ISBN 9780195373028.
- Jafri, S.H.M. (1979). Origins and Early Development of Shi'a Islam. Longman. ISBN 0582780802.
- Kassam, Z.; Blomfield, B. (2015). "Remembering Fatima and Zaynab: Gender in Perspective". In Daftary, F.; Sajoo, A.; Jiwa, S. (eds.). The Shi'i World: Pathways in Tradition and Modernity. I.B. Tauris. ISBN 9780857729675.
- Kennedy, H. (2016). The Prophet and the Age of the Caliphates: The Islamic Near East from the Sixth to the Eleventh Century (Third ed.). Routledge. ISBN 9781138787612.
- Khetia, V. (2013). Fatima as a Motif of Contention and Suffering in Islamic Sources (Thesis). Concordia University.
- Kohlberg, E. (2012a). "Zayn al-'Ābidīn". In Bearman, P.; Bianquis, Th.; Bosworth, C.E.; van Donzel, E.; Heinrichs, W.P. (eds.). Encyclopaedia of Islam (Second ed.). doi:10.1163/1573-3912_islam_SIM_8144. ISBN 9789004161214.
- Kohlberg, E. (2012b). "S̲h̲amir (also al-S̲h̲amir, commonly S̲h̲imr) b. D̲h̲i 'l-D̲j̲aws̲h̲an". In Bearman, P.; Bianquis, Th.; Bosworth, C.E.; van Donzel, E.; Heinrichs, W.P. (eds.). Encyclopaedia of Islam (Second ed.). doi:10.1163/1573-3912_islam_SIM_8893. ISBN 9789004161214.
- Madelung, W. (1997). The Succession to Muhammad: A Study of the Early Caliphate. Cambridge University Press. ISBN 0521561817.
- Madelung, W. (2003). "Ḥasan b. 'Ali b. Abi Ṭāleb". Encyclopaedia Iranica. Vol. XII/1. pp. 26–28. ISSN 2330-4804.
- Madelung, W. (2004). "Ḥosayn b. 'Ali i. Life and Significance in Shi'ism". Encyclopaedia Iranica. Vol. XII/5. pp. 493–498. ISSN 2330-4804.
- Momen, M. (1985). An Introduction to Shi'i Islam. Yale University Press. ISBN 9780300035315.
- Munson, H. (1988). Islam and Revolution in the Middle East. Yale University Press. ISBN 0300041276.
- Nakash, Y. (1993). "An Attempt to Trace the Origin of the Rituals of 'Āshūrā'". Die Welt des Islams. 33 (2): 161–181. doi:10.1163/157006093X00063.
- Nashat, G. (1999). "Women in the Middle East: 9000 B.C.E.–C.E. 1800". In Nashat, G.; Tucker, J.E. (eds.). Women in the Middle East and North Africa: Restoring Women to History. Indiana University Press. pp. 5–72. ISBN 9780253212641.
- Nematollahi Mahani, M.A. (2013). The Holy Drama: Persian Passion Play in Modern Iran. Leiden University Press. ISBN 9789400600348.
- Osman, R. (2015). Female Personalities in the Qur'an and Sunna: Examining the Major Sources of Imami Shi'i Islam. Routledge. ISBN 9781315770147.
- Pinault, D. (1998). "Zaynab bint 'Alī and the Place of the Women of the Households of the First Imāms in Shī'īte Devotional Literature". In Hambly, G. (ed.). Women in the Medieval Islamic World: Power, Patronage, and Piety. Macmillan. pp. 69–98. ISBN 9780333740965.
- Pinault, D. (2001). Horse of Karbala: Muslim Devotional Life in India. Palgrave. ISBN 0312216378.
- Pinault, D. (2004). "Imami (Twelver)". In Martin, R.C. (ed.). Encyclopedia of Islam and the Muslim World. Vol. 2. Macmillan Reference USA. pp. 624–628. ISBN 0028656059.
- Pinault, D. (2009). "Zaynab bint 'Alī". In Esposito, J.L. (ed.). Oxford Encyclopedia of the Islamic World. Oxford University Press. ISBN 9780199861255.
- Qutbuddin, T. (2005). "Zaynab bint 'Alī". In Jones, L. (ed.). Encyclopedia of Religion. Vol. 14 (Second ed.). Macmillan Reference USA. pp. 9937–9939. ISBN 002865983X.
- Qutbuddin, T. (2006). "Fatima (al-Zahra') bint Muhammad (ca. 12 before Hijra–11/ca. 610–632)". In Meri, J.W. (ed.). Medieval Islamic Civilization: An Encyclopedia. Vol. 1. Routledge. pp. 248–250. ISBN 9780415966917.
- Qutbuddin, T. (2019). "Orations of Zaynab and Umm Kulthūm in the Aftermath of Ḥusayn's Martyrdom at Karbala: Speaking Truth to Power". In Korangy, A.; Rouhi, L. (eds.). The 'Other' Martyrs: Women and the Poetics of Sexuality, Sacrifice, and Death in World Literatures. Harrassowitz Verlag. pp. 103–132. ISBN 9783447112147.
- Sayeed, A. (2008). "Zaynab". In Smith, B.G. (ed.). The Oxford Encyclopedia Women in World History. Oxford University Press. ISBN 9780195337860.
- Sindawi, K. (2002). "The Image of Ḥusayn ibn 'Alī in Maqātil Literature" (PDF). Quaderni di Studi Arabi. 20/21: 79–104. JSTOR 25802958.
- Shah-Kazemi, R. (2006). "'Ali ibn Abi Talib". In Meri, J.W. (ed.). Medieval Islamic Civilization: An Encyclopedia. Vol. 1. Routledge. pp. 36–37. ISBN 9780415966917.
- Szanto, E. (2012). "Sayyida Zaynab in the State of Exception: Shi'i Sainthood as 'Qualified Life' in Contemporary Syria". International Journal of Middle East Studies. 44 (2): 285–299. doi:10.1017/S0020743812000050.
- Tabatabai, S.M.H. (1975). Shi'ite Islam. Translated by Nasr, S.H. State University of New York Press. ISBN 0873953908.
- Veccia Vaglieri, L. (2012a). "(al-)Ḥasan b. 'Alī b. Abī Ṭālib". In Bearman, P.; Bianquis, Th.; Bosworth, C.E.; van Donzel, E.; Heinrichs, W.P. (eds.). Encyclopaedia of Islam (Second ed.). doi:10.1163/1573-3912_islam_COM_0272. ISBN 9789004161214.
- Veccia Vaglieri, L. (2012b). "(al-)Ḥusayn b. 'Alī b. Abī Ṭālib". In Bearman, P.; Bianquis, Th.; Bosworth, C.E.; van Donzel, E.; Heinrichs, W.P. (eds.). Encyclopaedia of Islam (Second ed.). doi:10.1163/1573-3912_islam_COM_0304. ISBN 9789004161214.
- Veccia Vaglieri, L. (2012c). "Fāṭima". In Bearman, P.; Bianquis, Th.; Bosworth, C.E.; van Donzel, E.; Heinrichs, W.P. (eds.). Encyclopaedia of Islam (Second ed.). doi:10.1163/1573-3912_islam_COM_0217. ISBN 9789004161214.
- Walker, A.H. (2014). "Abu Bakr al-Siddiq (c. 573–634)". In Fitzpatrick, C.; Walker, A.H. (eds.). Muhammad in History, Thought, and Culture: An Encyclopaedia of the Prophet of God. Vol. 1. ABC-CLIO. pp. 1–4. ISBN 9781610691789.
- Wellhausen, J. (1901). Die religiös-politischen Oppositionsparteien im alten Islam (in German). Weidmannsche Buchhandlung. OCLC 453206240.
- Wellhausen, J. (1927). The Arab Kingdom and Its Fall. Translated by Graham Weir, M. University of Calcutta. OCLC 752790641.
