= Awn ibn Abd Allah ibn Ja'far =

Son of a companion of the Prophet

Awn ibn Abd Allah ibn Ja'far عون بن عبدالله بن جعفر
- Born: Medina
- Died: 10th of Muharram, 61st Islamic year (October 10, 680 CE); Karbala, Umayyad Caliphate (present-day Iraq)
- Cause of death: Martyred in the Battle of Karbala
- Burial place: Imam Husayn Shrine, Karbala
- Known for: Participation in the Battle of Karbala against Yazid I's armed forces
- Opponent: Umayyad Caliph Yazid I & his armed forces
- Parent(s): Abd Allah ibn Ja'far (father); Zaynab bint Ali (mother)
- Relatives: Ja'far ibn Abi Talib (grandfather) Muhammad (brother)

ʿAwn ibn ʿAbd Allāh ibn Jaʿfar (Arabic: عون بن عبدالله بن جَعفر), known as Awn al-Akbar (died October 10, 680), was a son of Zaynab who accompanied Husayn ibn Ali on his journey from Mecca to Kufa. He was martyred on the Day of Ashura.

== Lineage ==
Awn was a son of Zaynab, Husayn's sister, and Abd Allah ibn Ja'far ibn Abi Talib who was a companion of the Prophet. Awn's grandfather was Ja'far al-Tayyar who was appointed by the Prophet as the chief of Muslims in their migration to Abyssinia. Abd Allah had two sons called Awn: Awn al-Akbar whose mother was Zaynab and Awn al-Asghar whose mother was Jamana, daughter of Musayyib ibn Najba.

== Accompanying Husayn ibn Ali ==
When Abd Allah ibn Ja'far learned about Husayn's departure to Kufa, he wrote a letter to Imam to convince him to return to Mecca. Abd Allah sent his letter to Imam by his sons Awn and Muhammad. When Abd Allah found that Imam was determined in his decision, advised his sons Awn and Muhammad to accompany him and fight along with Husayn.

== On the day of Ashura ==
After Muhammad was martyred, Awn went to the battlefield. According to Ibn Shahr Ashub, he killed 3 horsemen and 18 foot soldiers from the army of Umar ibn Sa'd and finally was martyred by Abd Allah ibn Qutba.
