= Abd Allah ibn Ja'far =

One of the youngest Companions (Sahabi) of Muhammad

Abd Allah ibn Ja'far عبد الله بن جعفر

Personal life
- Born: c. 622 or 626 Abyssinia
- Died: c. 699 or 702/704 Medina, Umayyad Caliphate (present-day KSA)
- Resting place: Al-Baqi Cemetery, Medina
- Spouse: Zaynab bint Ali; Layla bint Mas'ud
- Children: Awn; Muhammad
- Parents: Ja'far ibn Abi Talib (father); Asma bint Umais (mother)
- Known for: companion of Muhammad
- Relatives: List: Ali (uncle); Fatimah (Aunt); Hasan; Husayn; Zaynab; Umm Kulthum; Muhammad; Abbas; Ruqayya; Abdullah; Ja'far; Hilal; Abd al-Malik (son-in-law)

Religious life
- Religion: Islam

Abd Allah ibn Ja'far ibn Abi Talib al-Hashimi (Arabic: عَبْدُ اللَّهِ ٱبْن جَعْفَر ٱبْن أَبِي طَالِب الْهَاشِمِي, romanized: ʿAbd Allāh ibn Jaʿfar ibn ʾAbī Ṭālib al-Hāshimī; c. 624 – 699 or 702/704) was a companion and relative of the Islamic prophet Muhammad, a nephew of Ali, a half-brother of Muhammad ibn Abi Bakr and grandfather of Abd Allah ibn Mu'awiya.

He was loyal to Ahl al-Bayt in spite of his absence at the Battle of Karbala. He is reported to have said: "Allah gave a chance to my two sons (Awn and Muhammad). I should have also been there. If I had been there I also would have sacrificed myself for Hussain Ibn e Ali." According to Richard Francis Burton he is widely recognized as the most sympathetic amongst Arabs. His grave is situated near Aqil ibn Abi Talib and Abu Sufyan ibn al-Harith (the grandson of Abd al-Muttalib) in al-Baqi Cemetery.

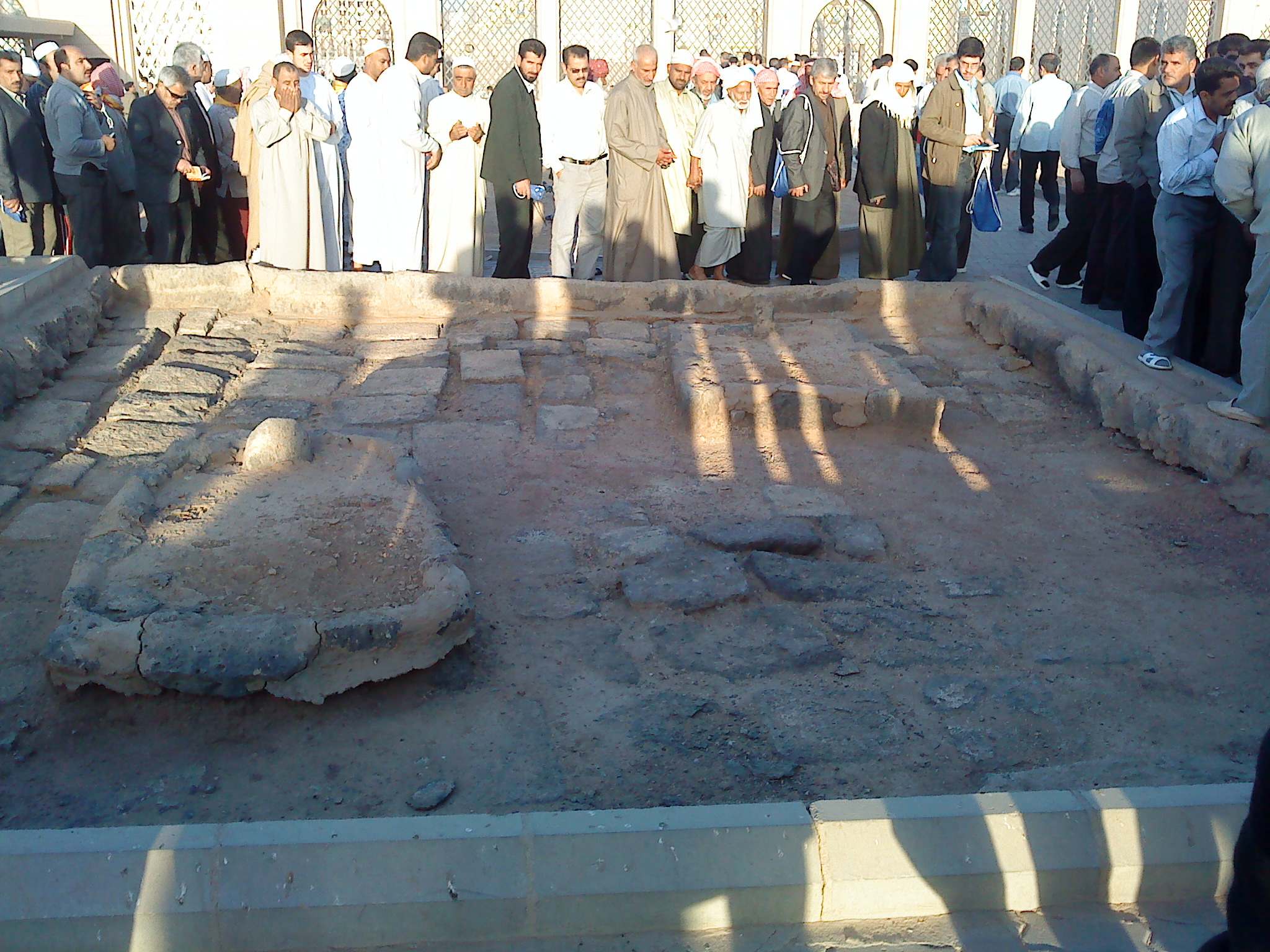
The Grave of Abd Allah ibn Ja'far in Al-Baqi

== Early life ==
He was the son of Ja'far ibn Abi Talib and Asma bint Umays. They had emigrated to Abyssinia in 616, and Abd Allah and his two brothers were born there. Abd Allah was the first Muslim to be born in Abyssinia. After the birth of Abd Allah in Abyssinia (Habesha, now Ethiopia), the king of the Kingdom of Aksum (Najashi) also had a son. He immediately asked the parents of Abd Allah ibn Ja'far about the name of their child. Upon knowing the name, the king of Abyssinia also chose the name “Abd Allah” for his first son. It is also stated that Asma bint Umays was the nursing mother of the son of the Abyssinian King. The younger brother of Abd Allah appears to be the first child in Muslim history who was named Muhammad after the Islamic prophet. The family returned to Arabia in 628 and settled in Medina.

=== Muhammad's supplication and instruction ===
In addition to Ibn Hajar's reference, it is said that 3 days after Ja'far's death, Muhammad went to the house of Asma and called for the children of Ja'far. He then said about each of them: "As for Muhammad, he resembles our uncle Abi Talib. As for Abd Allah, he resembles me in terms of both my appearance and character." Afterward, Muhammad took the right hand of Abd Allah and said "O Allah, provide a successor for Ja'far in his family, and bless Abd Allah in his business," and repeated this appeal to the Almighty thrice. Muhammad instructed the sons of Abi Talib, namely Ja'far, Aqil and Ali that they should arrange marriages of their children with their cousins.

== Marriage and family life ==
Ali had particularly wished that his daughters should marry Ja'far's sons. When Abd Allah asked for Zaynab's hand, Ali accepted it. Abd Allah and Zaynab had two children.

According to Shaykh Muhammad Abbas Qummi, Abd Allah had 20 sons from different wives, including five children from Zaynab bint Ali. The Daira-e-Maarif Islamia (Circle of Islamic Knowledge) of University of the Punjab (pages 568-70, Vol.X) describes Zaynabi as a progeny of Abd Allah’s son Ali through Zaynab bint Ali.

Abd Allah ibn Ja'far was one of the richest people in Medina and a philanthropist who was called as “Bahr al-Joud” which means an ocean of charity.

When Ali became the Caliph in 656 and moved from Medina to Kufa, Zaynab and Abd Allah joined him.

=== His wife’s journey with Husayn ibn Ali ===
It is related that Zaynab forecast the journey to Karbala before her marriage to Abd Allah. So permission for going there with her brother was obtained from Abd Allah during the marriage negotiations. With regard to the absence of Abd Allah at the Battle of Karbala, it is said it was due to his poor eyesight. Consequently, he was unable to bear the demands of the journey and the battle. Knowing about Husayn's journey to Kufa, Zaynab, the wife of Abd Allah ibn Ja'far begged her husband's permission to accompany her brother. Recognising the anxiousness of her husband she stated that:

You know that for 55 years my brother and I have never been separated. Now is the time of our old age and the closing period of our lives. If I leave him now, how shall I be able to face my mother, who at the time of her death had willed, “Zaynab” after me you are both mother and sister for Husayn? It is obligatory for me to stay with you, but if I do not go with him at this time, I shall not be able to bear the separation.

Abd Allah then granted his permission and sent their two sons for the destined journey.

Abd Allah was concurrently married to Layla bint Mas'ud. With reference to books ‘Nasab e Quraish Page-83’ and ‘Jameerath ul Nasab by Ibn Hazm page 62’ it is described that Layla bint Mas'ud ibn Khalid was “al-Zawja al-Thaniya (second wife)”. Through this marriage he had two daughters (Umm Muhammad and Umm Abiha) and four sons (Yahya, Harun, Salih and Musa).

== Career ==
=== Battles ===
With regard to his presence in the Battle of the Camel, it is said that at the end of the battle, while entrusting the return of Aisha to Medina under the protection of her brother Muhammad ibn Abi Bakr, Ali ordered for payment of 12,000 dirhams to Aisha. Abd Allah thinking that the amount was too little, provided a larger sum for Aisha. According to Ibn A'tham al-Kufi, in the Battle of Siffin Abd Allah commanded the infantry in the army of Ali ibn Abi Talib together with his half-brother, Muhammad ibn Abi Bakr and his cousins, Muhammad ibn al-Hanafiyya and Muslim ibn Aqil.

=== Politics ===
Abd Allah was a prominent advisor to his uncle Ali during the First Fitna. He maintained a reputation for liberality and patronage in Medina, earning him the nickname “the Ocean of Generosity”. Following the assassination of Ali in 661, Abd Allah joined his cousins Hasan and Husayn in performing the funeral rites. They washed the body and dressed it for burial in three robes without a kurta.

During Ali's reign, Abd Allah was heavily involved in administrative decisions regarding Egypt. Ali received intelligence reports claiming that his governor Qays ibn Sa'd had secretly pledged allegiance to Mu'awiya I. Ali consulted his sons and Abd Allah to decide on a course of action. Following the advice of Abd Allah, Ali sent a letter to Qays ordering him to demand a public oath of allegiance (bay'ah) from the Egyptian people and to fight those who refused. Qays wrote back to Ali defending his more moderate approach.

Abd Allah then persuaded Ali to replace Qays with Muhammad ibn Abi Bakr as the governor of Egypt. He argued that if Qays had actually defected to Mu'awiya he would refuse to surrender his position. The historian al-Tabari later noted that this was poor advice because the dismissal of the experienced Qays weakened Ali's control over the region. This decision ultimately contributed to the Umayyad conquest of Egypt and the death of Muhammad ibn Abi Bakr.

Abd Allah also acted as an intermediary between the public and the Caliph. On one occasion a chief from an Iraqi village asked Abd Allah to recommend his case to Ali. After Ali granted the request, the chief attempted to send 40,000 dirhams to Abd Allah as a reward. Abd Allah refused the money and explained that he did not sell his good deeds.

== His vision for Husayn ==
Knowing the death of his two sons in the Battle of Karbala, people were offering condolences to Abd Allah, one of his Mawili (Abu al-Lislas [a companion]) said that “this is what we have met and what has come upon us through Husayn ibn Ali” on this statement he struck him with his sandal and told that I am pleased that my two sons killed with my brother and cousin. By God! If I had been present with him, I would have preferred not to leave him in order that I would be killed with him. He then seeking attention of people consoling him, said that “Praise be to God, Who has made life hard, console Husayn ibn Ali with my own hands, my two sons consoled him.

=== Letter to Husayn ===
Ibn Khaldun in chapter 2 volume II title “Yazid-I” from 60 to 64 AH, it is described that Abd Allah sent a letter through his sons Awn and Muhammad, to Husayn, requesting that “for God sake come back. It is my advice to you in anxiety that you would be killed and Ahl al-Bayt destroyed. As a result, earth’s light will come to an end, there would be no leader for Muslims. Please do not hurry in journey, I would be reaching there after this letter." Later he went to Amr ibn Sa'id who was Yazid's governor of Mecca and asked him to write a letter to Husayn offering him a guarantee of harmless behavior assuring him kindness and open-handedness. "Show trust to him in your letter and request him to return." This letter was replied by Husayn too.

== See also ==
- Yahya ibn Umar- Descendant of Abd Allah ibn Ja'far who led a rebellion

== Sources ==
- https://web.archive.org/web/20070319112108/http://www.jafariyanews.com/articles/2k5/13june_syedaZaynab.htm biography
- https://web.archive.org/web/20110716082212/http://www.dartabligh.org/months/jamadilawwal/janabe_zainab%28a.s%29.html
- https://web.archive.org/web/20091230032022/http://home.earthlink.net/~downloadquran/Maqtal_al-Husain.pdf (See Maqtal al-Husayn page 213).
