= Al-Tall Al-Zaynabiyya =

Holy site for Shi'a Islam in Karbala, Iraq

Coordinates: 32°36′57″N 44°01′52″E

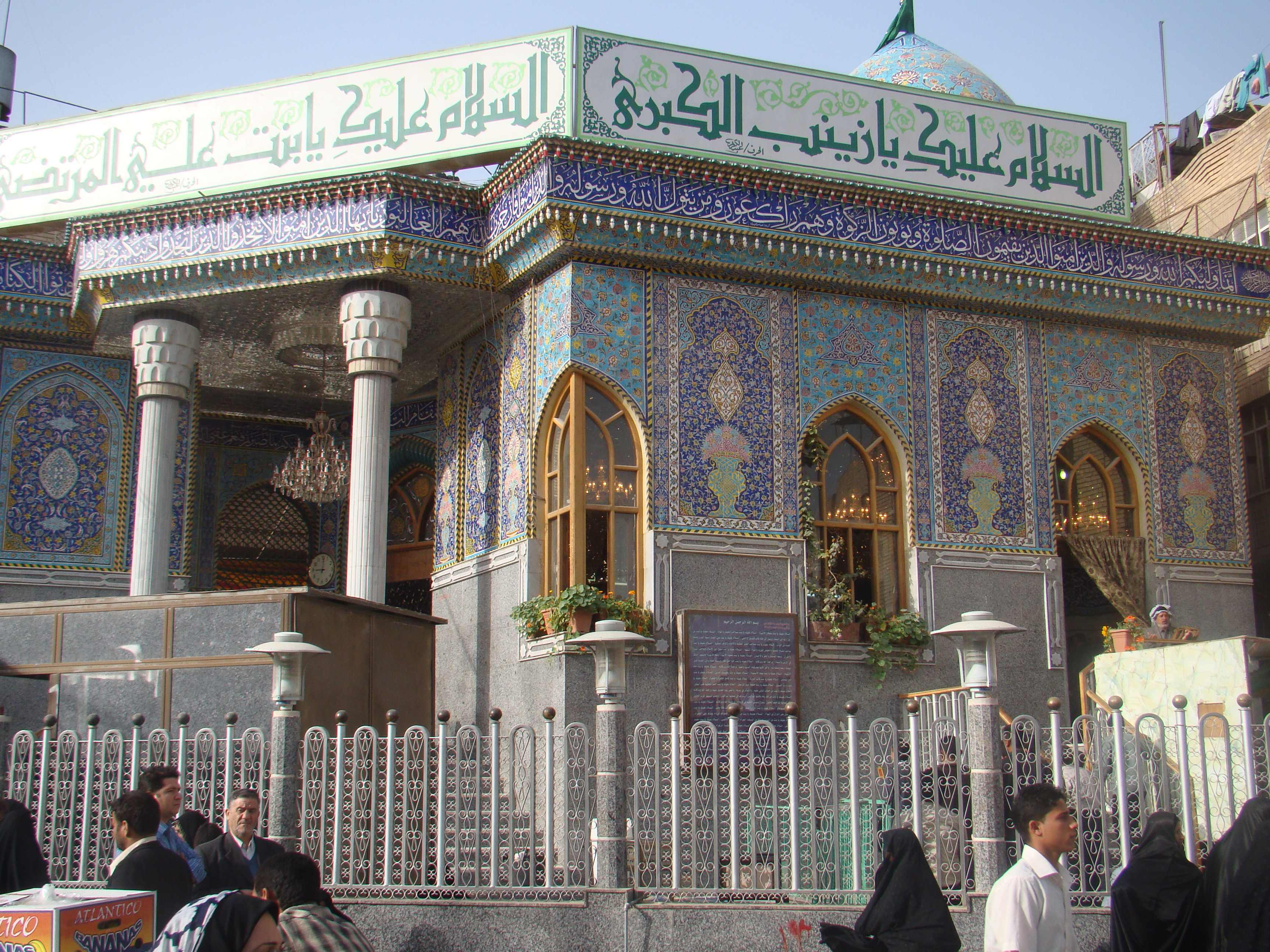
Al-Tall Al-Zaynabiyya, Karbala, Iraq

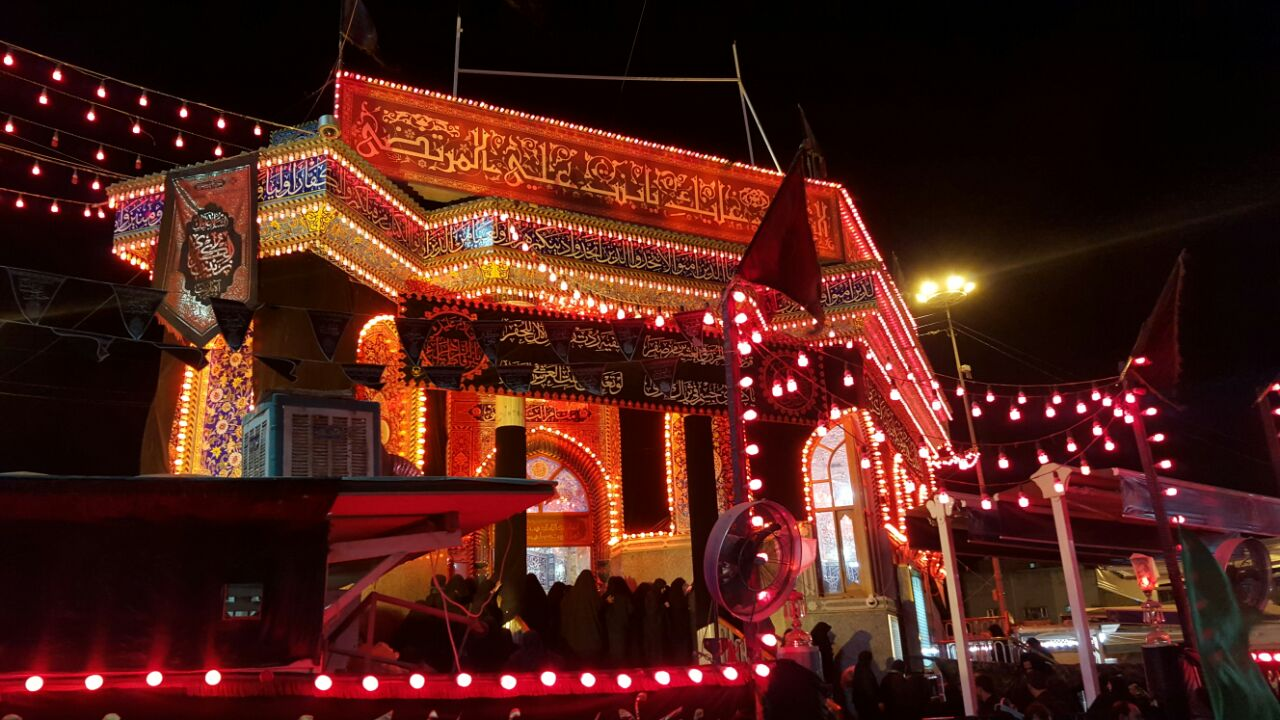
Al-Tall Al-Zaynabiya (at night)

Al-Tall Al-Zaynabiyya (Arabic: التل الزینبیة) is the name of a Shia Islamic holy place in Karbala, Iraq. It overlooks the site of the martyrdom of Husayn ibn Ali, who was killed during the Battle of Karbala on the day of Ashura.

During the Battle of Karbala, Ali ibn Abi Talib's daughter and Husayn's sister (Zaynab) went to Tall Zaynabiyya to stay informed about the status of Ali ibn Abi Talib's son, Husayn ibn Ali.

Al-Tall Al-Zaynabiyya is located at the southwest of Husayn's shrine. It is approximately five meters higher than the floor of the courtyard; its distance to the place where Husayn was killed is almost 35 meters. The site was built like a room with access to a few stages and has a dome with blue tiles. The Tall al-Zaynabiyya was rebuilt in 1978 (near the end of 1398 AH).

== Meaning ==
In Arabic, the word tall (Arabic: تل) means a projection of soil or sand on the ground, and the word zaynabiyya is related to Zaynab, Ali ibn Abi Talib's daughter.

== See also ==
- List of casualties in Husayn's army at the Battle of Karbala
- Family tree of Muhammad
