= Zayn Kassam =

American religious studies scholar

- Born: Kenya

Academic background
- Education: McGill University

Academic work
- Discipline: Islam, environment, and gender
- Institutions: Pomona College; Institute of Ismaili Studies

Zayn R. Kassam is an American religious studies scholar known for her work on gender roles in Islam and Indian philosophy with 29 publications of her work as of July 2022. She was the chair of the religious studies department at Pomona College, and in January 2023, she began her term as director of the Institute of Ismaili Studies.

== Early life and education ==
Kassam was born and raised in Kenya. She attended the Aga Khan Primary Schools in Kisumu, Mombasa, and Nairobi. Kassam went on to receive her high school diploma from Aga Khan High School in Nairobi. It was here where she was first introduced to the subjects of racial and religious diversity. Upon her move to Canada, Kassam began to study literature at McGill University. After learning about the Bible and other religious texts, Kassam decided to switch her major to religious studies. She completed her undergraduate, graduate, and doctoral degrees at McGill University. Kassam received a B.A. in Religious Studies in 1977, a M.A. in Islamic Studies in 1985, and a Ph.D. in History of Religions in 1995, with a focus on Indian and Islamic philosophy.

== Career ==
Kassam spent one year at The Institute of Ismaili Studies in 1998 as a research fellow where she taught a course on gender. She began working at Pomona College in Claremont, California in 1995, where she served as the chair of the religious studies department twice, co-chair of the Climate Study Group, co-ordinator for Gender and Women’s Studies, and co-ordinator for Middle Eastern studies. Kassam was later appointed to Associate Dean for DEI and the John Knox McLean Professor of Religious Studies. During her career at Pomona College, she was awarded three Wig Awards for Distinguished Teaching, as well as an American Academy of Religion Excellence in Teaching Award. She also served as director of the Pacific Basin Institute. Kassam is currently serving on the national boards of the Journal of Feminist Studies In Religion and the Journal of the American Academy of Religion. She continues to teach various courses in the subjects of mysticism, gender, literature, ethics, and environmentalism.

== Academic awards ==
Award	Institution	Year
National Teacher of the Year Award	American Academy of Religion	2005
Wig Distinguished Professorship Award for Excellence in Teaching	Pomona College	1998, 2005, 2015
Kathleen Connolly-Weinart Leader of the Year Award	Theta Alpha Kappa	2015

== Publications ==
Following the 9/11 attacks, Kassam began educating people about Islam and politics in the middle east. She is the author of Introduction to the World's Major Religion's: Islam (2006), editor of Women and Islam (2010) and Women in Asian Religions (2018). She is a section editor for Islam in the volume on Islam, Judaism and Zoroastrianism in the Encyclopedia for Indian Religions (2018).
