= Advisory council of Egypt's scientists and experts =

The advisory council of Egypt's scientists and experts
- المجلس الأستشارى لعلماء و خبراء مصر

Agency overview
- Formed: 2014; 12 years ago
- Headquarters: Cairo, Egypt
- Agency executive: Abdel Fattah el-Sisi
- Parent agency: Presidency of Egypt

The advisory council of Egypt's scientists and experts, Arabic: المجلس الأستشارى لعلماء و خبراء مصر is an advisory council formed by the Egyptian President Abdel Fattah el-Sisi in September 2014. Made up of academics and experts, according to the Presidency, the council aims to provide a strategic vision for the state in the future and to provide advisory opinions on projects such as the new Suez Canal development project. President Sisi also said that the council will help aid in correcting religious discourse, improving media discourse and improving the quality of education and linking it to the needs of the market.

== Formation ==
The advisory council members include:

=== Education and scientific research ===
- Dr. Ahmed Zewail, Nobel laureate, Professor of Physics and the director of the Physical Biology Centre for the Ultrafast Science and Technology at the California Institute of Technology.
- Dr. Nabil Aly, Construction and rehabilitation of structures Professor at Berlin University.
- Dr. Vector Rizkallah, Former Vice president at Leibniz University Hannover and former president of Engineers chamber in Germany.
- Dr. Nabil Fouad Grees, Head of engineering department and director of Center for innovative materials research (CIMR) at Lawrence Technological University.

=== Megaprojects ===
- Eng. Hany Azer, Chief Engineer of Germany's fourth largest train station in Berlin, Berlin Hauptbahnhof.

=== Energy ===
- Eng. Hany el-Nokrashy, CEO and founder of El-Nokrashy company for engineering in Germany, member of Federation of German Scientists (VDW) and Chairman of the Board of Trustees at DESERTEC.
- Eng. Ibrahim Samak, Founder, Engcotec.

=== Agriculture ===
- Dr. Hany Abdullah
- Dr. Hany El-Kateb for agriculture and forestry

=== Geology ===
- Dr. Farouk El-Baz, Research Professor, Director of the Center for Remote Sensing at Boston University and adjunct Professor of Geology at the Faculty of Science, Ain Shams University
- Dr. Mohamed el-Bahy

=== IT ===
- Dr. Aly el-Faramawi, Corporate Vice President at Microsoft Corporation and its President of Middle East & Africa.

=== Economy ===
- Dr. Mohamed A. El-Erian, Chief Economic Adviser at Allianz and former CEO of PIMCO.

=== Medicine and Public Health ===
- Dr. Mohamed A. Ghonim
- Sir Magdy Yacoub, Professor of Cardiothoracic Surgery at Imperial College London.

=== Mental Health and Societal consensus ===
- Dr. Ahmed Okasha, Professor of psychiatry at Ain Shams University and former president of World Psychiatric Association.

=== Pre-university education ===
- Dr. Mervat Ahmed, Professor of Courses and teaching methods at Benha University.

=== Specialised council for Community Development ===
- Dr. Mohamed A. Zaazoue, Specialist Neurosurgeon and Post-doctoral Research Fellow at Harvard Medical School's Boston Children's Hospital.
