= Mohamed Zaazoue =

Egyptian neurosurgeon

Mohamed A. Zaazoue
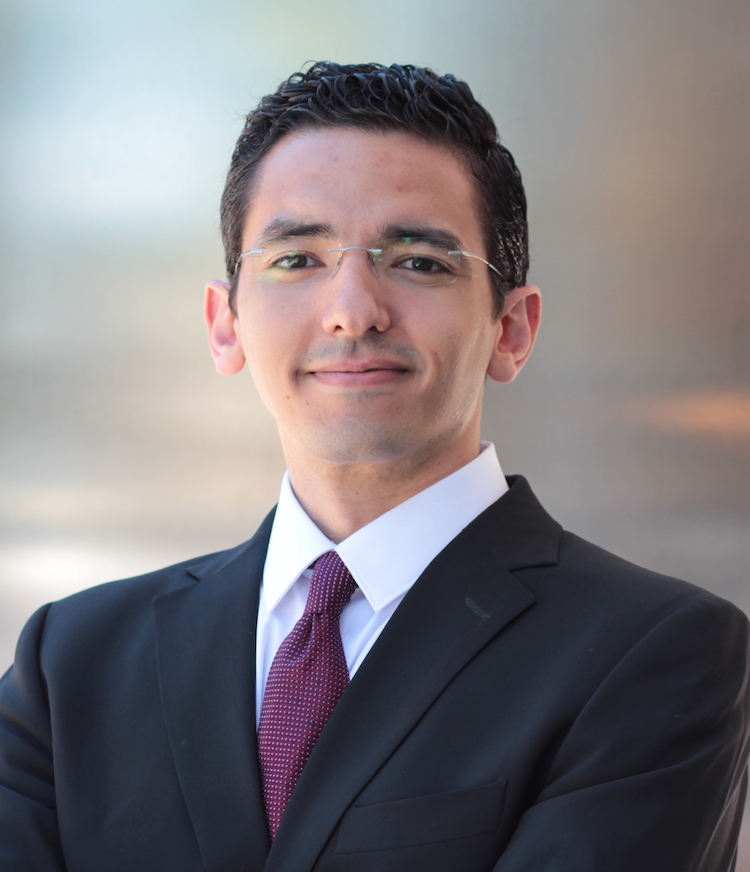
- Dr. Mohamed A. Zaazoue's headshot around the Longwood Medical Area in Boston, MA in 2016
- Born: September 6, 1987 (age 39); Sharjah, United Arab Emirates
- Education: -Complex spine fellowship, Washington University in St. Louis -Neurosurgery residency, Indiana University Hospitals
- Alma mater: Ain Shams University, Faculty of Medicine (MBBCh)
- Occupations: Neurosurgeon and spine surgeon, University of Wisconsin-Madison

Mohamed A. Zaazoue is an attending neurosurgeon at the University of Wisconsin in Madison. He has advanced expertise in complex spine deformities — including scoliosis —, spinal oncology, and robotic and minimally invasive surgery. He treats a wide range of conditions, including scoliosis, degenerative spine disease, spinal stenosis, cervical spine disorders, spine tumors and spinal trauma.

He completed a post-residency complex spine deformity fellowship at the prestigious orthopedic surgery department at Washington University in St. Louis. He also completed a Neuro oncology and skull base surgery fellowship training under renowned neurosurgeon Dr. Aaron-Cohen Gadol.

In 2025, Zaazoue was selected as one of SpineLine’s 20 Under 40 in the U.S. This honor is part of the North American Spine Society's (NASS) effort to recognize young leaders in spine care who are making meaningful contributions to the field.

Zaazoue completed his neurosurgery residency training at the neurosurgery department at Indiana University. He was inducted into the Gold Humanism Honor Society in 2019 and was elected for membership to the Alpha Omega Alpha honor society in 2021.

He was the chair of the Graduate Medical Education Patient Safety and Quality Council at Indiana University School of Medicine and the HIPAA resident liaison at the school. He is also a member of the Congress for Neurological Surgeons Resident Committee.

He is the founder of Healthy Egyptians, a non-profit, non-governmental organization in Egypt, which aimed to spread health awareness and preventive medicine through the use of media tools.

He is an Ashoka fellow, and was chosen as one of the Forbes 30 Under 30 most influential people under 30 in the world in 2014. He has given a number of talks at TEDx Cairo, Harvard School of Public Health, Clinton Global Initiative University, Middle East Institute, Population Council, many Egyptian universities and NGOs.

== Neurosurgery residency ==
Zaazoue is a graduate of Ain Shams University medical school, followed by studying neurosurgery at the Ain Shams University Hospital. During his training, he managed to expand the resources of the neurosurgery department by raising funds to obtain neuroendoscopy and other surgical equipment as well as increasing the ICU beds capacity. By the end of his residency, he finished his Master of Science (M.Sc) in Neurological Surgery. In Egypt, residents are required to earn a M.Sc degree in their medical or surgical specialty in order to complete their residency training and become specialists.

== Public health work ==
=== Healthy Egyptians ===
As the founding president of Healthy Egyptians, Zaazoue focuses on integrating technology and art in his health awareness messages.

One of the organisation's projects, Protect Your Child, was focused on creating a healthcare icon that would resonate with the young audience and their families. The project created a cartoon character called "Montasser" (Arabic word for 'victorious') who goes about his daily life in school, at home, on the street or in the club and has different encounters with infectious organisms and bad health habits. With the help of his doctor friend and his lab of special scientific tools, he combats these organisms and saves his fellow friends and family from the diseases. The organisms included in each story have easy and funny names, but are always derived from the proper scientific name of the causative organism. For example, in a story about pneumonia, the "evil characters" are named Hemo and Nemo, which are the cartoon names for Hemophilus influenzae and Streptococcus pneumoniae, the two most common causative organisms of pneumonia worldwide.

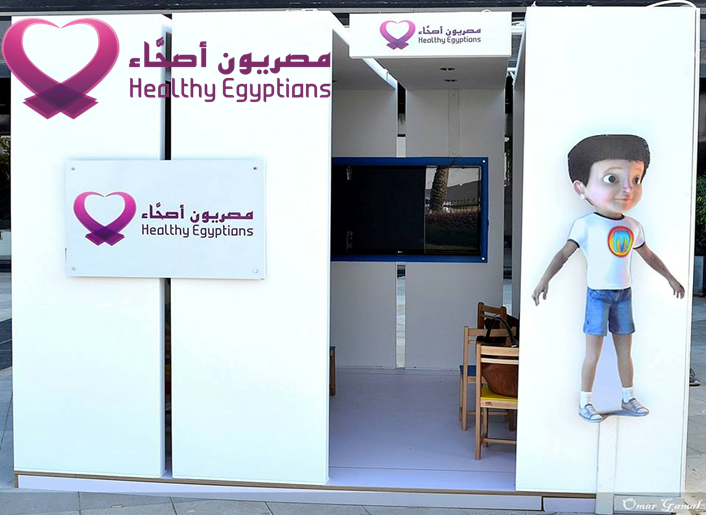
The Portable Child Cinema that was carried on a truck to roam the country and reach remote areas with limited access to facilities.

The concept of Montasser was first applied in a comic book called Montasser Overcomes, which was later turned into a coloring comic book with a complementary set of coloring crayons. To increase the interest of Montasser's audience, the story was transformed into puppet shows. After creating Montasser Overcomes: Pneumonia, Montasser Overcomes: Gastroenteritis, Montasser Overcomes: Iron Deficiency Anemia, and Montasser Overcomes: Rheumatic Heart Disease, Healthy Egyptians created a high-quality 3-D cartoon of Montasser Overcomes: Pneumonia. The cartoon was aired on satellite and Egyptian television and screened in outpatient clinics, schools, nurseries, social clubs and shopping malls.

To reach remote areas where access to the Internet or television is not easy, Healthy Egyptians created a Portable Child Cinema, which roamed the country and screened the cartoon to children in different places.

The work he did as part of Healthy Egyptians was featured in the Financial Times, BBC, Reuters and Al Jazeera.

=== Immunisation advocacy ===
Healthy Egyptians has been among the most dedicated advocates in Egypt for the introduction of life-saving vaccines to the Egyptian National Immunisation Program. Through Zaazoue's advocacy activities, he founded the Egyptian Coalition against Child Pneumonia, which included different organisations that share the vision of decreasing pneumonia morbidity and mortality rates in Egypt. According to the World Health Organisation (WHO), pneumonia is the primary disease which kills children under the age of 5. One of the key members of the coalition was the Maternal and Child Health Integrated Program (MCHIP) and the USAID Bureau for Global Health's flagship program.

In 2012, Healthy Egyptians also succeeded in raising funds to provide children from low socio-economic classes in Egypt with 30,000 doses of Pneumococcal Conjugate Vaccine, with a net value of EGP 11,500,000 (around $2,000,000, using 2012 exchange rates). The vaccines were provided free of charge to university and government hospitals all around the country. In 2014, the Egyptian Ministry of Health introduced the Haemophilus influenzae type B (HiB) vaccine in the National Immunisation Program, an important milestone in the fight against preventable diseases. The pneumococcal conjugate vaccine, the rotavirus vaccine and the Hepatitis A vaccine are yet to be introduced to the National Immunisation Program.

=== Presidential advisory council ===
In 2014, Zaazoue was appointed as an advisor to President Abdel-Fattah al-Sisi of Egypt on community development and healthcare reform. During his advisory work, he pushed for the introduction of health education in public schools, and he has been vocal on the public healthcare system reform, especially issues pertaining to university hospitals' research and training.

== Ambassador ==
Zaazoue was chosen as the brand ambassador for Philips AVENT, which is the product line of Philips concerned with mother and child. During this time, he helped create a short comedy series called "Fi Baytena Baby" (Arabic for "We have a baby at home") of four episodes that provides young mothers with answers to the most common questions about newborn and infant care like breastfeeding, weaning, balanced diet, colic and sleeping. The webisodes were highly creative and informative which made them a big hit on Egyptian social media among young and expecting parents. The episodes were used by Philips AVENT in Egypt and after its social media success, Philips AVENT Middle East added translation subtitles and adopted them.

== Research ==
His research areas of interests are pediatric neurosurgery and tumors. He is interested in the standardization of patient management and the introduction of guidelines in neurosurgical practices, specifically those conditions whose management remains controversial, such as pineal region tumors.

In March 2016, Zaazoue was a reviewer of presentations, workshops and posters' abstracts submitted to the American University in Cairo's community psychology conference titled Collaboration for Community Change: Insight, Innovation, and Impact.

== Grants ==
Year	Grant	Organisation
2014	Urban Youth Fund, Grant received by Healthy Egyptians Association for development.	UN Habitat
2012	World Pneumonia Day Advocacy Program	Johns Hopkins Bloomberg School of Public Health
2011-2012	Southern Vaccine Advocacy Challenge	Grand Challenges Canada

== Awards ==
Year	Award	Organisation
2015	Starts of Social Entrepreneurship	American Chamber of Commerce
2014	Forbes "30 Under 30"	Forbes
2012	Rexley Cross Award	International Federation of Medical Students' Associations
2012	Urban Ingenuity Award	
2011	Best Project Award	East Mediterranean Region Meetings
