= Sameh Egyptson =

Swedish writer (born 1966)

Sameh Egyptson (born Sameh Nabeh Basely Khalil, 1966) is an Egyptian-born Swedish writer and academic in the field of interreligious relations at the Humanities and Theology Faculties at Lund University.

== Biography ==
Sameh Nabeh Basely Khalil was born on 8 September 1966, in Aswan, Egypt, but grew up in Cairo in a Coptic Christian family. After high school, he studied Middle Eastern and Egyptian history at Ain Shams University, while also studying at the Coptic Institute in Cairo.

Khalil moved to Sweden as a political refugee in 1990 and took the name Egyptson in 2001. In Sweden, he studied language, Islamic studies, and religious studies at Uppsala and Lund universities.

== In media ==
On 23 February 2023, a seminar was held in Sweden's Riksdag where Egyptson was invited by member of parliament Robert Hannah from the Liberals to present his PhD thesis. There, Egyptson criticized the Swedish politicians who he claimed have given power to an ultra-conservative group to represent Muslims in Sweden.
