= Paul Ghalioungui =

Egyptian endocrinologist

Paul Ghalioungui بول غليونجي
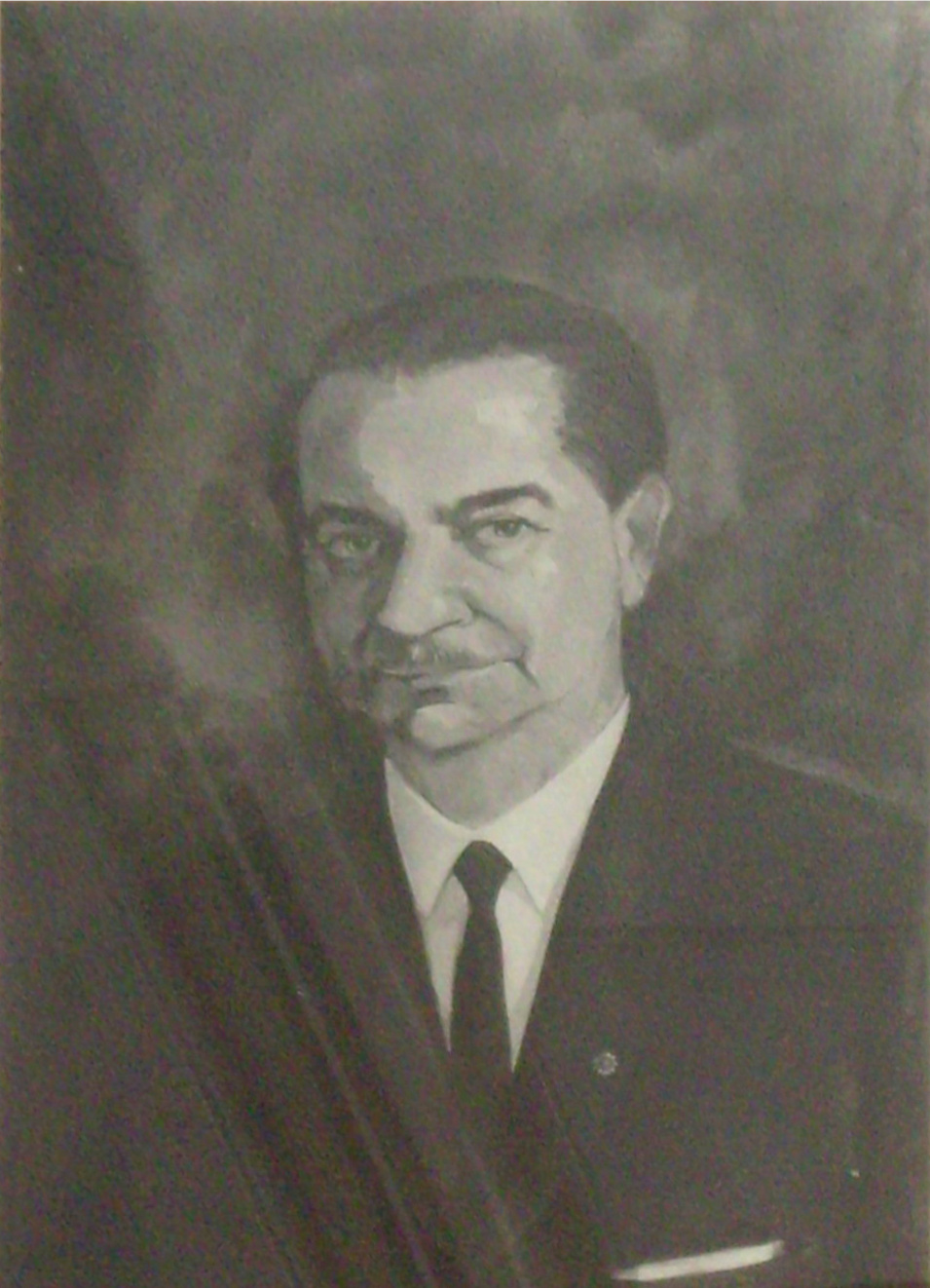
- Paul Ghalioungui painting in Ain Shams University Hospital Central Library, Cairo
- Born: 1908; Mansoura, Egypt
- Died: 1987 (aged 78–79); Egypt
- Education: University of Cairo
- Known for: History of Ancient Egyptian medicine
- Scientific career
- Fields: Egyptology, Medicine Endocrinology
- Workplaces: Ain Shams University

Paul Ghalioungui or Ghalioungi (1908–1987) (Arabic: بول غليونجي), MD (Cairo), MRCP (Lond), Professor of Medicine and former Chairman of Internal Medicine department, Ain Shams University Faculty of Medicine. An Egyptian endocrinologist, historian of Egyptian medicine, Egyptologist and an authority on Pharaonic medicine, he wrote a vivid history of Egyptian medicine in English, French, Arabic, German, and Spanish.

== Life ==
Ghalioungui was born in Mansoura, Egypt to an Eastern Orthodox Christian family of Greek descent. His great-grandfather was a man named Kyriacos Kaliontzis, whose children later changed the family surname to the more Arabic-sounding “Ghalioungui”. An Egyptian by birth, education, and practice, he writes of present and past Egyptian medicine (in Arabic, English and French) as only a clinician could write whose hobby was Egyptian archaeology and medical history. "It has long been my conviction that the medical history of a nation should be written by a native. A practising physician, Dr. Ghalioungui proves this contention."

He also had two sons in the early 1940s. He spent some time in Kuwait during the 1970s.

Mohammad Kamel Hussein (MKH), a prominent orthopedic surgeon in Egypt, encouraged both Paul Ghalioungui, then head of internal medicine, and Ahmed Ammar, a gynecologist at Ain Shams Medical College, to pursue the study of ancient Egyptian medicine. Hussein had a particular interest in the history of medicine, especially that of ancient Egypt.

Paul Ghalioungi was president of the XXIXth International Congress of the History of Medicine, Egypt-Cairo December 26, 1984 – January 1, 1985. The main theme was Egyptian medicine up to the 3rd century of the Christian era, Islamic medicine, and east–west relations.

Ghalioungui was familiar with both ancient Egyptian and modern medicine. He was a founder or member of several medical societies in Egypt, as well as Swiss and American endocrinology societies, the Royal Society of Medicine, and the International Society of the History of Medicine. During his career, he spent periods of study and professional activity in Austria, England, France, Kuwait, Switzerland, and the United States. He frequently cited the phrase, “Life is short. Art is long. Experience is fallible. Opportunity is fleeting. Judgment is difficult,” in his lectures and writings.

He had many connections and correspondence with international scientists. Some of his letters to them are preserved abroad.

Perhaps his interest in the history of medicine started from publishing his paper "Sur deux formes d'obésité représentées dans l'Égypte ancienne" on obesity and its types in Ancient Egypt, which represented a connection between his work as an endocrinologist and the history of medicine.

=== Education ===
MB BCh from Cairo University Faculty of Medicine, Cairo, Egypt
MSc from Ain Shams University Faculty of Medicine
M.D. in Internal Medicine (Endocrinology) from Ain Shams University Faculty of Medicine
MRCP

== Scientific and clinical career ==
Registrar to the Medical Unit, Kasr el Aini Hospital, Cairo, Egypt
Chairman of the Departments of Internal Medicine, Ain Shams Faculty of Medicine
Member of the International Society for the History of Medicine.

== Scientific contributions ==
- Famous writer on the History of Medicine in the 1960s, 1970s and 1980s.
- "Paul Ghalioungui suggested in 1963 that the Egyptians "were the first in History to dare look at the other side of the abyss that separates magic from Medicine" The art of healing in ancient Egypt: a scientific reappraisal. The Lancet, Volume 372, Issue 9652, Pages 1802-1803 by R. David
- Publication of Ibn al-Nafis role in discovery of blood circulation and the "Theory of Blood Capillaries". Dr. Paul Ghalioungui summarizes the fundamental changes Ibn al-Nafis made to the incorrect Galenic-Avicennian theory
1. "Denying the existence of any pores through the interventricular septum."
2. "The flow of blood from the right ventricle to the lungs where its lighter parts filter into the pulmonary vein to mix with air."
3. "The notion that blood, or spirit from the mixture of blood and air, passes from the lung to the left ventricle, and not in the opposite direction."
4. "The assertion that there are only two ventricles, not three as stated by Avicenna."
5. "The statement that the ventricle takes its nourishment from blood flowing in the vessels that run in its substance (i.e. the coronary vessels) and not, as Avicenna maintained, from blood deposited in the right ventricle."
6. "A premonition of the capillary circulation in his assertion that the pulmonary vein receives what comes out of the pulmonary artery, this being the reason for the existence of perceptible passages between the two."

About capillaries theory he wrote: Ibn al-Nafis had an insight into what would become a larger theory of the capillary circulation in his assertion that the pulmonary vein receives what comes out of the pulmonary artery, this being the reason for the existence of perceptible passages between the two."

- A member of the Vanderbilt Nutrition Research Group at NAMRU-3 studied many aspects of nutrition including nutrition in ancient Egypt. This activity involved three key collaborators, William J. Darby, affectionately known as Bill or WJD, Louis Grivetti, MS, an aspiring nutritional anthropologist, ... and the endocrinologist Paul Ghalioungui, MD, an authority on Pharonic medicine. Their collaboration resulted in the definitive monograph, (W.J. Darby, P. Ghalioungui and L. Grivetti. Food: The Gift of Osiris. Vol. I and II. Academic Press, Inc. (London) Limited, pp. 900, 1977). The "15 years during which these volumes were being assembled permanently fixed (Bill's) long existing interest in history of food, food science, and nutrition that had been initiated by teachings of Paul Day, PhD and Howard B. Lewis, PhD. During these years (Bill) became an avid bibliophile"
- He used to write philosophical quotations in his undergraduate book. A few lines in a textbook by the professor of endocrinology, Paul Ghalioungui, have been etched in Yehia El-Rakhawi the psychiatrist, writer, critic and poet. mind ever since he read them in his fourth year at the university. They have served as a guide to his work: "Life is short. Art is long. Experience is fallible. Opportunity is fleeting. Judgement is difficult"
- Publishing the English edition of the Ebers Papyrus, which is a scroll 20.23 meters in length and contains 108 columns of text. It is dated to the reign of Amenophis I (1536 B.C.). This papyrus was published and translated by different researchers (the most valuable is the German edition Grundriss der Medizin der alten Ägypter, and based on the Ghalioungui edition)
- In 1963 Ghalioungui found that, whilst urine from non-pregnant women prevented the growth of (modern) barley and wheat, it proved impossible to detect the sex of an unborn child from the rate of growth of either grain. Nevertheless, the fact that the Egyptians recognised that urine carried the pregnancy factor was remarkable. The standardisation of reliable urine tests for pregnancy did not occur until 1929.
- Identified the aaa disease in the Ebers Papyrus as schistosomiasis

== Publications ==
=== Publishing editor ===
1. 1985 F. A. Sondervorst, J.-C. Sournia, P. Ghalioungui "XXIXth International Congress of the History of Medicine, Cairo December 26th 1984-January 1, 1985: Proceedings", Language: English, French, The International Society of the History of Medicine, Cairo, Egypt, 1985, 2 vol., XIX-639 p.

=== Editor ===
1. "ABD AL-LATIF (AL-BAGHDADI) Maqalatann fi-l-Hawass wa Masa'il Tabi'iya" Kuwait, Government Press, 1972 in-8, 205 pp.; texte arabe édité par Ghalioungui Paul et Abdou Said

=== Translator ===
- Questions on Medicine for Scholars / By Ḥunayn Ibn Isḥāq; translated into English with a Preface and historical Note bt Paul Ghalioungui 1 vol., XLIX-162 p.; 25 cm. Al-Ahram Center for scientific translations, Cairo, Egypt, 1980
- Medical Manuscripts of Averroes at el-Escorial / G.C. Anawati, P. Ghalioungui; translated with an Introduction and Commentaries by G.C.Anawati and P. Ghalioungui; critical Text established by G.C. Anawati and S. Zayed, Language of text: English, Language of original work: Arabic, Le Caire: Al-Ahram Center for scientific translations, Egypt, 1986. 1 vol., 499 p.; 25 cm.

=== Revision ===
- Ibn Nafis book "Sharh Tashreh Al-Qanon of Ibn Sinna" = Explanation of Anatomy section of Avicenna's Canonكتاب شرح تشريح القانون / لعلاء الدين أبي الحسن علاء الدين بن أبي الحزم القرشي الدمشقي بن النفيس (687هـ) ؛ تحقيق سلمان قطاية ؛ مراجعة بول غليونجي ؛ [تصدير إبراهيم مدكور] Author : Ibn Nafis, Editor : Salman Qattayia, Revision Paul Ghalioungi, General book organisation, Cairo, Egypt, 1988 1 vol., 455 p.; 29 cm ISBN 977-12-2026-8 (978-977-1220-26-8)

=== Author ===
==== Books ====
===== 1980s =====
1. 1987 Paul Ghalioungui "The Ebers papyrus. A New English Translation, Commentaries and Glossary". 298 pages, Publisher: Academy of Scientific Research and Technology, Cairo (1987), Language: English, ASIN: B0006ERXEG
2. 1985 Paul Ghalioungui "Abd al-Latif al-Baghdadi, tabib Al-Qarn Al-Sadis Al-Hijri: Shakhsiyatuhu, Injazatuh" عبد اللطيف البغدادي : طبيب القرن السادس الهجري : شخصيته، إنجازاته Authors: Paul Ghalioungui, Muwaffaq al-Din Abd al-Latif al-Baghdadi Language: Arabic Format: Book, 230 pages, Publication Date: January 1985, Alam Al-Arab series, General Book Organisation, Cairo 1985 ISBN 977-01-0640-2, Language: Arabic
3. 1983 Paul Ghalioungui "La Medecine Des Pharaons: Magie Et Science Medicale Dans L'Egypte Ancienne" Book - January 1983 238 pages, Publisher:Les Enigmes de l'univers. Paris: Robert Laffont (1983), Language: French, ISBN 2-221-01179-1, ISBN 978-2-221-01179-9
4. 1983 Ghalioungui, Paul. The Physicians of Pharaonic Egypt. Sonderschrift 10. Cairo: Al- Ahram Center for Scientific Translations; Springfield, VA: U.S. Dept. of Commerce. National Technical Information Service, 1983.
  1. 1983 Paul Ghalioungui "The physicians of Pharonic Egypt", 115 pages, Publisher: Al-Ahram Center for Scientific Translations, Cairo (1983), Language: English, ASIN: B0006YCXJG
  2. 1983 Ghalioungui, P. "The physicians of Pharaonic Egypt (Sonderschrift / Deutsches Archaeologisches Institut. Abteilung Kairo)"Mainz: Verlag Philipp von Zabern, West Germany 1983. Hardcover: 115 pages, Publisher: Available from the U.S. Dept. of Commerce, National Technical Information Service (1983), Language: English, ISBN 3-8053-0600-8, ISBN 978-3-8053-0600-3
  3. 1983, 1984 Paul Ghalioungui "The Physicians of Pharaonic Egypt" by National Library of Medicine (U.S.), Book - January 1983 Language: English
5. 1980 Paul Ghalioungui "Questions on medicine for scholars by Ḥunayn ibn Isḥāq", translated by Paul Ghalioungui, from a critical edition by Galal M. Moussa, Ph.D., of the Ninth Century Arabic Text, "Al Masā'il fī al-ṭibb lil muta'allimin (An English translation of the Ḥunayn 's original treatise has been published in Cairo: Al-Ahram Center for Scientific Translations, Cairo 1980)
6. 1980 Ghalioungui "Questions on medecine", Le Caire, 1980, in La médecine arabe et l'occident médiéval, Maisonneuve & Larose, 1990, p. 47-48.

===== 1970s =====
1. 1979 Ghalioungui, P "Kul-- La Takul" Book on correction of Arabic Language pronunciation mistakes - January 1979 Publisher: Dar al-Maarif, Cairo (1979), Language: Arabic, ISBN 977-247-808-0, ISBN 978-977-247-808-8
2. 1979 Paul Ghalioungui "Selections from history of Medicine" قطوف من تاريخ الطب / تأليف بول غليونجي ؛ تصدير إبراهيم مدكور, 1 vol., Pp. 327, Bibliography, Language: Arabic, Publisher: Ain Shams University, Cairo.
3. 1977 William J. Darby, Paul Ghalioungui, Louis Grivetti "Food: the Gift of Osiris" Language: English, San Francisco; London; New York City: Academic Press, United States of America, 1977, 2 vol., ISBN 978-0-12-203402-2 (vol.2); 0-12-203401-5 (vol.1) A two-volume history of food in Egypt. Language: English
4. Paul Ghalioungui "The House of Life: Per Ankh Magic and Medical Science in Ancient Egypt"
  1. 1973 Paul Ghalioungui "The House of Life: Per Ankh Magic and Medical Science in Ancient Egypt" Book - January 1973 Hardcover: 198 pages, Publisher: B. M. Israel, Amsterdam; [2. herz. druk] edition (1973), Language: English, ISBN 90-6078-062-0, ISBN 978-90-6078-062-6 A comprehensive overview of the extensive medical knowledge held by the Ancient Egyptians.
  2. 1963, 1965 Ghalioungui, P. The House of Life, Per Ankh: Medicine and Magic in Ancient Egypt. Amsterdam: B. M. Israel Boekhandel, 1973. A revision of Magic and Medical Science in Ancient Egypt. London: Hodder and Stoughton,1963. Reprinted New York, Barnes & Noble, 1965.
5. 1972 Paul Ghalioungui "ABD AL-LATIF (AL-BAGHDADI) Maqalatann fi-l-Hawass wa Masa'il Tabi'iya", Kuwait, Government Press, 1972; texte arabe édité par Ghalioungui Paul et Abdou Said Language: Arabic
6. Paul Ghalioungui, "Ibn an-Nafis"
  1. 1983 Paul Ghalioungui, "Ibn an-Nafis", General Book Organisation, Cairo, 1983 Language: Arabic, Al-Dar Al- Masryiah for Publication, Cairo. 1 vol., 199 pp.
  2. 1970 Paul Ghalioungui "Ibn Nafis" ابن النفيس, in Studies in the Arabic Heritage, Ministry of information of Kuwait.
  3. 1966 Paul Ghalioungui, "Ibn an-Nafis" ابن النفيس, Alam Al-Arab series, Cairo, 1966 Language: Arabic, Al-Dar Al- Masryiah for Publication, Cairo. 1 vol., 199 pp.

===== 1960s =====
1. 1965 Paul Ghalioungui "Thyroid enlargement in Africa,: With special reference to the Nile Basin (Memoires de l'Institut d'Egypte)", Author/Creator:Ghalioungui, Paul. Published:Cairo: National Information and Documentation Centre, 1965. Format:Book Physical Desc.:132 p.: ill., maps.; 24 cm. Language:English Arabic Series:Mémoires de l'Institut d'Egypte; Note:Added t.p.: in Arabic. Contributor:Egypt Institute (1918- ), ASIN: B0006FF46E
2. Paul Ghalioungui "Magic and Medical Science in Ancient Egypt"
  1. 1965 Paul Ghalioungui "Magic and Medical Science in Ancient Egypt", Publisher: Barnes And Noble; Reprint edition (January 1, 1965), ASIN: B001TD8ZOU
  2. 1963 Paul Ghalioungui, Magic and Medical Science in Ancient Egypt (Cairo, Amsterdam and London 1963) Language: Arabic and English
  3. 1963 Ghalioungui, Paul. "Magic and Medical Science in Ancient Egypt". London: Hodder and Stoughton, 1963. 2. überarbeitete Auflage veröffentlicht als: "Per Ankh: Magic and Medical Science in Ancient Egypt". Amsterdam: Israels Boekhandel, 1973. Eine weitere Auflage dieses Werks, mit einem zusätzlichen Kapitel über Pathologie erschien als: "La Médecine des pharaons: Magie et science médicale dans l'Egypte ancienne" (= Les énigmes de l'univers). Paris, 1983.
3. Paul Ghalioungui "HEALTH AND HEALING IN ANCIENT EGYPT"
  1. 1970 Ghalioungui, Paul "Health and healing in ancient Egypt: a pictorial essay" Dar al-Maaref, 1970 Cairo, Egypt
  2. 1980 Paul Ghalioungui and Zeineb el Dawakhly "HEALTH AND HEALING IN ANCIENT EGYPT" Publisher: Dar Al-Maaref Cairo (1980), ASIN: B000IWE9RK
  3. 1965 GHALIOUNGUI, Paul, Health and Healing in Ancient Egypt, Cairo, 1965.
  4. 1965 Paul Ghalioungui "Health and healing in ancient Egypt,: A pictorial essay", 50 pages, Publisher: Dar al-Maaref, Cairo (1965), Language: English, ASIN: B0006FF400
  5. 1965 Ghalioungui, P. and Dawakhly, Z. el-. Health and Healing in Ancient Egypt: A Pictorial Essay. Publisher: The Organization for Authorship and Translation, Cairo, 1965.
  6. 1965 Ghalioungui, Paul and Zeineb el Dawakhly "HEALTH AND HEALING IN ANCIENT EGYPT" الحضارة الطبية في مصر القديمة / بول غليونجي، زينب الدواخلي ؛ [مقدمة شارل كوينتز] Dar Al-Maaref, Cairo n/d. First Edition., Language: English and Arabic, 1965, Description 1 vol., 50-174-55 p.
4. 1960 Ghalioungui, Paul "Medicine and Magic" طب وسحر / بول غليونجي, Language: Arabic, Dar Al-Qalam for printing and Publishing, Al-Nahda press, Cairo 1960, 1 vol., 118 pp.
5. 1965 Health and Healing in ancient Egypt / Paul Ghalioungui, Zeinab el Dawakhly الحضارة الطبية في مصر القديمة / بول غليونجي، زينب الدواخلي ؛ مقدمة شارل كوينتز
6. Paul Ghalioungui "Endocrines, vitamins, and some common metabolic disorders"
  1. 1963 Paul Ghalioungui, Ahmed Ghareeb "Endocrines, vitamins, and some common metabolic disorders" Author/Creator:Ghalioungui, Paul. Published:[. Format:Book Physical Desc.:351 p. ill. Related Items:1st ed. has title: Endocrines, gout & vitamins, including diabetes. Dar al-Maaref, Cairo 1963 Contributor:Ghareeb, Ahmed. Language:English Edition:3rd ed.
  2. 1960 Paul Ghalioungui "Endocrines, vitamins and some come common metabolic disorders" Cairo, 1960
  3. 1955 Paul Ghalioungui "Endocrines, Gout & Vitamins (including Diabetes)" Al-Maaref Press, Cairo (1955), ASIN: B001RYU5JY

===== 1950s =====
1. 1958 Ghalioungi P. "Medicine in Ancient Egypt". الطب عند قدماء المصريين / بول غليونجي Egypt: Dar Al. Ma'arif, Cairo 1958 Language: Arabic, 1 vol., 88 pp.

==== Articles ====
===== Articles on History of Medicine =====
====== 1980s ======
1. 1988 The Physicians of Pharaonic Egypt, by Paul Ghalioungui, published in The Journal of Near Eastern Studies, vol. 47/3, pp. 199–201 (Chicago)
2. 1986 Ghalioungui, P. "A Comparison Between the Medical Plants Mentioned in Graeco-Roman and Ancient Egyptian Papyri." Bulletin of the Center of Papyrological Studies 3 (1986): 9–16.
3. 1986 Ghalioungui, Paul. "Quelques contributions récentes de la médecine à l'Égyptologie". In: Fs Daumas 1 (1986), pp. 273–278.
4. 1984 Ghalioungui, Paul. "The Title imy-r3 gs-wy dpt pr-`3". MDAIK 40 (1984): 31–32.
5. 1982 Paul Ghalioungui (1982), "THE WEST DENIES IBN AL-NAFIS'S CONTRIBUTION TO THE DISCOVVERY OF THE CIRCULATION" "západ popírá Ibn Al Nafis příspěvek k objevu cirkulace", Symposium na Ibn al-Nafis, Druhá internacionála jednání o islámské medicíně: Islámská lékařská organizace, Kuvajt (cf. Západ popírá Ibn Al Nafis příspěvek k objevu cirkulace, Encyklopedie islámského světa)
6. 1980 Ghalioungui, P. "Medicine in Ancient Egypt." In An X-Ray Atlas of the Royal Mummies, ed. J. E. Harris and E. F. Wente, 52–98. Chicago: University of Chicago Press, 1980.
7. 1980 and 1984 "Hunayn IBN ISHÂQ, Questions on Medicine for Scholars", translated into English by Paul Ghalioungui, AI-Ahram Center for Scientific Translations, Cairo, 1980, XLIX = 164 pp Author: Troupeau, G. Source: Arabica, Volume 31, Number 1, 1984, pp. 108–108
8. 1983 P. Ghalioungui, "Was Ibn al-Nafis unknown to the scholars of the Scholars of the European Renascence Clio Med., 18, 1-4, 1983 Pp 37-42
9. 1983 ANAWATI, G. and P. GHALIOUNGUI: "The Device of Healing in: The Medical Treatises of Averroes at E1 Escorial," Cairo: AI-Ahram, 1983.
10. 1980s Prof. Paul Ghalioungui "THERAPY BY FOODS OR DRUGS? The preference of foods by Islamic physicians out of compassion towards their patients". EGYPT.
11. 1983 Ghalioungui, Paul. "The Physicians of Pharaonic Egypt" (= SDAIK, 10). Mainz, 1983. [AEB 83.1130 English]
12. 1982 Dr. Paul Ghalioungui "THE WEST DENIES IBN AL-NAFIS'S CONTRIBUTION TO THE DISCOVERY OF THE CIRCULATION"
13. 1981 Ghalioungui, P. "Remarques sur la structure du corps medical egyptien ـ l'epoque pharaonique." In Bulletin du Centenaire, 11–18. Bulletin de l'Institut Franهais d'Archىologie Orientale Supplement. Vol. 81, Cairo: Institut Franهais d'Archىologie Orientale, 1981.
14. 1980 Ghalioungui, Paul. "The Last Days of Psametik, Physician to Pharaoh: A Tale". Transactions and Studies of the College of Physicians of Philadelphia 5, 1 (1980): 90–111.

====== 1970s ======
1. 1977 Ghalioungui, Paul. 1977. "The Persistence and Spread of Some Obstetric Concepts Held in Ancient Egypt." Annales du Service des Antiquités de l'Égypte 62: 141–154.
2. 1977 Paul Ghalioungui "The legend of Abdullatif al-Baghdady's "spirit"", Language: English, Institut français d'Archéologie orientale (Ifao), Annales islamologiques. – Le Caire : Institut français d'Archéologie orientale (Ifao), t.13, 1977. 1 vol., P.257-267
3. 1976 F. Daumas et P. Ghalioungui "Quelques représentations de maladies oculaires dans l'ancienne Égypte", Language: French, "Chronique d'Égypte", Belgium t.50, n°101, 1976 P. 17-29
4. 1975 GHALIOUNGUI (Paul) "Les plus anciennes femmes-médecins de l'Histoire (The oldest Female Physician in History)" (Article in French) about Peseshet, who lived under the Fourth Dynasty, is often credited with being the earliest known female physician in ancient Egypt. Her title was "lady overseer of the female physicians,"
5. 1975 Ghalioungui, Paul. "Les plus anciennes femmes-médicins de l'histoire". BIFAO 75 (1975): 159–164.
6. 1974 Ghalioungui, Paul und G. Wagner. "Terres cuites de l'Égypte gréco-romaine de la collections P. Ghalioungui". MDAIK 30 (1974): 189–198. Beispiele grotesker und entstellter Darstellungen von Menschen.
7. 1973 Ghalioungui, Paul. "Algunos fundamentos filosóficos subyacentes en las explicaciones greco-árabes de la diabetes". Bs. As., La Prensa Médica Argentina, 1973; 59, p. 1942.
8. 1971 HABACHI, L. & GHALIOUNGUI, Paul "The 'House of Life' of Bubastis", Chronique d'Égypte, Bulletin périodique de la Foundation Éyptologique Reine Élisabeth, Tome XLVI. Foundation Égyptologique Reine Élisabeth. Bruxelles, 46, 1971, pp59–71

====== 1960s ======
1. 1969 Ghalioungui, Paul. 1969. "Parasitic disease in Ancient Egypt" Bull. Inst. Egypte 48-49:13-
2. 1969 Ghalioungui, Paul. "Ancient Egyptian Remedies and Mediaeval Arabic Writers". BIFAO 68 (1969): 41–46.
3. 1969 Ghalioungui, Paul. 1969. "Ancient Egyptian Remedies and Mediaeval Arabic Writers." Bulletin de l'Institut Français d'Archéologie Orientale 68: 41–46.
4. 1969 GHALIOUNGUI, P.: " Lanotion de maladie dans les textes egyptiens et ses rapports avec la theorie humorale" Bull. Inst Grangais d'Archeol Orientale, XIII, 4, 383 1969.
5. 1969 P Ghalioungui "Early specialization in ancient Egyptian medicine and its possible relation to an archetypal image of the human organism". Med Hist. 1969 October; 13(4): 383–386.
6. 1969 GHALIOUNGUI, Paul Miguel Servet, "Ibn al Nafis". Gac. Méd. Esp., 43, 1969.
7. 1969 Paul Ghalioungui "The "smr" Animal of the Ebers Papyrus". Bulletin de l'Institut Français d'Archéologie Orientale du Caire, ISSN 0255-0962, Nº 68, 1969, pags. 39-40
8. 1968 Ghalioungui, P. "The Relation of Pharaonic to Greek and Later Medicine." Bulletin of the Cleveland Medical Library 15 (1968): 96–107.
9. 1968 Paul Ghalioungui "La notion de maladie dans les textes égyptiens et ses rapports avec la théorie humorale". Bulletin de l'Institut Français d'Archéologie Orientale du Caire, ISSN 0255-0962, Nº 66, 1968, pags. 37-48
10. 1965, 1966 Ghalioungui, Paul, and Samir Guindi. 1965–6. "The Persistence of the Use of Catamenial Blood." Bulletin de l'Institut d'Égypte 47: 65.
11. 1965 P. Ghaloungui "What was the importance of magic in ancient egyptian medicine?", Language: English, Cahiers d'Alexandrie, Alexandrie : [s.n.], 1965, P 17-34
12. 1964 GHALIOUNGUI (Paul) "Sur l'exophthalmie de quelques statuettes de l'Ancien Empire" [avec 4 planches]. BIFAO 62 (1964), p. 63-65
13. 1963 Ghalioungui, P., Khalil, S. and Ammar, A. R. "On an Ancient Egyptian Method of Diagnosing Pregnancy and Determining Foetal Sex." Medical History 7 (1963): 241–46.
14. 1963 Ghalioungui, Paul. "The Medical Objects in the Cairo Museum". Egypt Travel Magazine 103 (1963): 6–15.
15. 1963 Ghalioungui, Paul. "Pharaoh's Doctors". Egypt Travel Magazine 108 (1963): 22–28.
16. 1963 Ghalioungui, Paul. "Pharaoh's Doctors and Their Titles". Egypt Travel Magazine 109 (1963): 10–17.
17. 1962 GHALIOUNGUI, P. 1962. "Some body swellings illustrated in two tombs of the Ancient Empire and their possible relation to aaa", Zeitschrift fur Agyptische Sprache und Altertumskunde 87: 108–14.
18. 1961 GHALIOUNGUI, P "La medicina en tiempo de los faraones" Symposium Ciba 1961 (5): 206-220
19. 1961 Ghalioungui, Paul "Medicine in the days of the pharaohs". Ciba symposium. [Offprint] v. 9, no. 5, 1961, p. [206]-220
20. 1961 Ghalioungui, P. "Algunas aspectos de la cirugia operatoria." Revista de la Sociedad Venezolana de Historia de la Medicina 9/23 (1961): 337–355.
21. 1960 Ghalioungui, Paul. "Medicine Under the Pharaohs". Egypt Travel Magazine 76 (1960): 6–12.

====== 1950s ======
1. 1950 Paul Ghalioungui "La medicina en el Egipto faraonico" Language: Spanish, Extrait du tome 1 de la "Historia universal de la medicina" Barcelona; Madrid, Spain (1950) P.95-128
2. 1949 Ghalioungui, Paul. "Sur deux formes d'obésité représentées dans l'Égypte ancienne". ASAE 49 (1949): 303–316.
3. 1947 Ghalioungui, P., "A Medical Study of Akhenaten", ASAE, 47, 1947, pp. 29–46

==== Medical Articles ====
1. 1963 A SIGN OF DESCENDING GOITRE by Paul Ghalioungui The Lancet, Volume 281, Issue 7292, Page 1218, 1 June 1963
2. 1963 GHALIOUNGI P. "THE MODERN MANAGEMENT OF DIABETES MELLITUS".J Egypt Med Assoc. 1963;46:705-16.
3. 1959 "THE CLINICAL EXPERIENCE WITH RADIOACTIVE IODINE IN THE TREATMENT OF THYROTOCICOSIS" Creator/Author Sinna, I.A.A.; Ghalioungi, P.; El Tawdy, S.D.; Kazim, I.; Gharib, A.M. Publication Date Technical report 1959 Oct 31
4. 1958 GHALIOUNGI, P., GHARRIB, A., ABDEL WAHAB, M. F., EL SHAWARBY, K., EL DEEN, SALAH, M. and Aziz, K. "A survey of goiter in the Kharga Oases and in the Asyut area". Bull. Inst. Desert, vol. 8, no. 2, 1958.
5. 1955 GHALIOUNGI, P., SHAWARBY, K., EL SADR, M. M., BARAKAT, M. Z., HANNA, S., NAGATI, H. F. and RIFAAT, A. "Final Report of the Abbassia Faculty of Medicine Studies at the Dakhla Oasis" 1955. Unpublished.
6. 1952 Nazek I. Fahmy and Paul Ghalioungui "The Cholesterol Tolerance Test in Normal Individuals" by Nazek I. Fahmy and Paul Ghalioungui, Department of Clinical Medicine and the Abbassiah Faculty of Medicine, Cairo. In J Clin Pathol. 1952 May; 5(2): 203–207.
7. 1949 Ghalioungui, Paul. "Sur deux formes d'obésité représentées dans l'Égypte ancienne". ASAE 49 (1949): 303–316.
8. 1934 A.G Biggam, M Hashim and Paul Ghalioungui "Treatment of papilloma by diathermy in intestinal bilharziasis" A Medical article written while he was a Registrar at the Medical Unit, Kasr el Aini Hospital, Cairo, Egypt. Published in Tropical medicine and hygiene journal Volume 27, Issue 4, Pages 409-412 (31 January 1934) by A.G Biggam, M Hashim and Paul Ghalioungui
9. Ghalioungi, P.; Nagaty, H.F.; El Shawarby, K.; Rifaat, H.A.; Abdullah Sadek, M- "A survey of goitre and parasitic and nutritional diseases in Upper Sudan"
10. Many Chapters on Medicine and Endocrinology in Egyptian and international books of Internal Medicine.
11. Many medical studies and reports in Egypt and Internationally.

==== Audio recordings ====
- 1973 P. Ghalioungui "Contribution of Artistic Archeology to Historical Medicine" Audio record 7 04-04-1973

== Legacy ==
His books and manuscripts has been dedicated after his death by his family to Ain Shams University Hospital Library, which was named after him as the Paul Ghalioungui Memorial Library.

== See also ==
- Ain Shams University
- Ain Shams University Faculty of Medicine
- Ancient Egyptian medicine
