= Muḥammad Mu'nes Awadh =

Egyptian historian (born 1956)

Muḥammad Mu’nes Awadh
- Born: 1956 (64–65 years old)
- Education: Ain Shams University
- Occupation: Historian

Muḥammad Mu’nes Awadh (born 5 October 1956) is an Egyptian historian who was born in Assiut Governorate.
