= Yehia El-Gamal (pediatrician) =

Egyptian pediatrician and immunologist (died 2021)

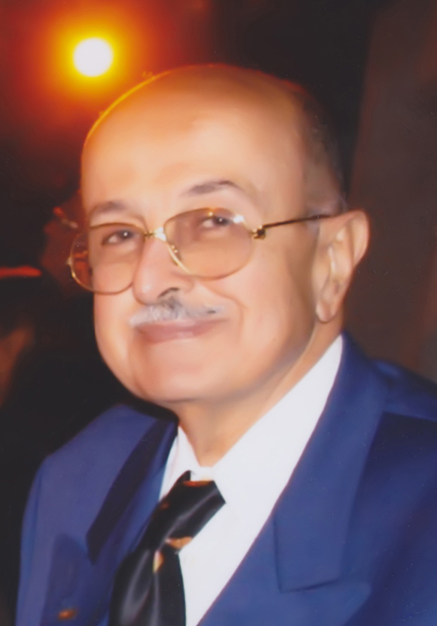
Yehia El-Gamal

Yehia El-Gamal (died 6 March 2021) was an Egyptian Professor of Pediatrics, Pediatric Allergy and Immunology Unit, and Chairman (1997-2001) of the Department of Pediatrics, Children's Hospital, Faculty of Medicine Cairo, Egypt. He established the first specialized unit of Pediatric Allergy and Immunology in Egypt in February 1988, and was president of the Egyptian Society of Pediatric Allergy and Immunology (ESPAI) which he founded in 2002, and editor-in-chief of the Egyptian Journal of Pediatric Allergy and Immunology.

== Career ==
He was a member of the Technical Advisory Group of the World Health Organization (WHO) for polio eradication from 2003 and shared in research projects with the WHO, the CDC (Atlanta, Georgia) and the Egyptian Ministry of Health to evaluate the efficacy of different types and regimens of oral polio vaccination.

He has 110 publications in international regional and national periodicals and was a member of the editorial board and regular reviewer of many national and international journals. He also supervised 30 PhD and 89 Masters Theses in pediatrics.

== Honours ==
He received the Egyptian Appreciation Award in Medical Sciences 2014.

He was a Fellow of the American Academy of Allergy, Asthma and Immunology(AAAAI) since 1992 and chair of its Middle East and Africa Region Committee of the AAAAI from 2008 to 2011. He received the ACAAI Distinguished International Fellow Award in 2009.

He was member of the World Allergy Organization (WAO) board of directors (2007-2011) and chair of the WAO's bylaws committee and co-chair of its ethics committee (2009-2011). He was associate editor of the WAO Journal since September 2007. He was granted the WAO Distinguished International Service Award 2011.

He was a member of several Egyptian National Specialized Councils and the Egyptian Academy of Scientific Research and Technology grants a 10,000 Egyptian pound distinction award carrying his name yearly since 1989.

He died on 6 March 2021.

== See also ==
- Faculty of Medicine Ain Shams University
- Pediatric department- Faculty of Medicine- Ain Shams University
