= Sa'ada Al-Dajani =

Saada Fawzi Al-Dajani
- سعادة الدجاني
- Born: Gaza City
- Citizenship: State of Palestine
- Occupation(s): Public prosecutor, judge
- Father: Fawzi Al-Dajani

Sa'ada Al-Dajani (Arabic: سعادة الدجاني) is a Palestinian judge. She is the first woman to become a deputy public prosecutor and judge in Palestine.

== Biography ==
Al-Dajani was born in Gaza City to a family who were displaced from Jerusalem. Her father, Fawzi Al Danjani, was a lawyer. In 1967, she obtained a Bachelor of Laws from Ain Shams University in Cairo. After obtaining her bachelor she worked at her father's firm. In 1971 she became the first female deputy public prosecutor, and in 1973 she was appointed to be a judge in the Magistrates' Court. Thirteen years later she was appointed to be a judge in the Central Court. In 1995, she was appointed to be a judge on the Supreme Court, being the first woman to hold this position in Palestine.

In 2007, Al-Dajani was appointed to the Central Elections Commission.
