= Fathy El Shazly =

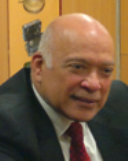

Director of the Executive Secretariat for the Demining & Development of the North West Coast
- Incumbent
- Assumed office 2007

Ambassador of Egypt to Turkey
- In office 1999–2003

Ambassador of Egypt to Saudi Arabia
- In office 1991–1995

Personal details
- Born: May 21, 1943 (age 83) Cairo, Egypt
- Children: 3
- Education: Ain Shams University
- Profession: Diplomat, Politician

Fathy El Shazly (born May 21, 1943) Egyptian diplomat and politician, the Director of the Executive Secretariat for the Demining & Development of the North West Coast.

== Life ==
He was born in Cairo to a middle-class family. He was the son of Sheick Abdel Hamid M. El Shazly, professor of Al Hadith at Al Azhar University and Diaa A. Zahran. He graduated in 1964 from the faculty of commerce at Ain Shams University.

Fathy El Shazly is the married father of three sons and grandfather of two girls.

== Career ==
El Shazly joined the Ministry of Foreign Affairs on 1 June 1965. He served in Egyptian Embassies at Bamako, Caracas, Stockholm and Addis Ababa, where he acted as Egypt's alternate representative to the Organisation of African Unity and to the Economic Commission for Africa, the UN branch for Africa.

He was appointed Ambassador to Saudi Arabia in 1991 and was Assistant Foreign Minister for European Affairs just between 1995 and 1999

He was the first national coordinator for the Egypt Euro/Mediterranean Partnership, between 1996 and 1999. He was Ambassador to the Republic of Turkey from November 1999 to March 2003.

He retired from the diplomatic service in June 2003, but in the fall of 2004 he was made advisor to the Minister of International Cooperation, working on Egypt's relationship with the European Union and the promotion of human rights.

=== Egypt Mine Action ===
In early 2007 he began directing Egypt/UNDP Mine action in the North West Coast of Egypt, working to mitigate the heavy contamination explosive remnants of World War II to open areas for mineral development.
