= Amani Al Tawil =

Egyptian journalist, researcher, expert on Sudan

- Citizenship: Egypt
- Education: Ain Shams University
- Occupations: Writer, researcher
- Known for: Expert on Sudan

Amani Al Tawil (Arabic: أماني الطويل) is a reporter, researcher and an expert in the affairs of Sudan and Director of the African Program at the Center for Al-Ahram Political and Strategic Studies. She is a member of the Council of the Egyptian African Affairs and a member of the Board of Center for Sudanese Studies Department at the Institute of African Research and Studies at Cairo University. She also worked as a consultant for the United Nations Development Program in Sudan between 2005 and 2006.

Academically, she worked as a visiting professor at the Elliott School of Foreign Affairs at George Washington University in the United States between 2009 and 2010, and taught the political history of Sudan and a number of African countries at Ain Shams University between 2004 and 2006. Amani holds a PhD from Ain Shams University in the subject of Egyptian-Sudanese relations.

She also co-authored the Arab Strategic Report and the Strategic Economic Trends Report issued by the Al-Ahram Center for Political and Strategic Studies, a co-author of the book Water Security and Regional Variables in the Nile Basin, the author of the book The Political Role of the Egyptian Elite Before the July Revolution on the Egyptian House of Shorouk 2007, and co-author and editor of the book The Status of Women in Egypt: A Study of the Levels of Representation in Leadership Positions issued by Al-Ahram Center for Studies. As a journalist, Amani writes articles in several newspapers, including: Al-Ahram, Al-Masry Al-Youm, Al-Shorouk and Al-Wafd, the Sudanese news and events, Al-Sharq Al-Qatari, and other press releases on Sudanese-African affairs and issues of democratic development in the Arab world.

== Books ==
- Lawyers between the profession and politics - a study in the history of the Egyptian elite (Original title: almuhamun bayn almihnat walsiyasiat - dirasat fi tarikh alnukhbat almisriati), 2007
- Egyptian-Sudanese Relations: Roots of Problems and Challenges of Interests: A Documentary Reading, (Original title: alealaqat almisriatu-alsuwdaniatu: judhur almushkilat watahadiyat almasalihi: qira'at wathayiqiatun) 2012
- Sudan from conflict to conflict, (Original title: alsuwdan min sirae 'iilaa siraei) 2018
- The social position of women working in the legal profession (Original title: almawqif alaijtimaeiu min eamal almar'at bimihnat almuhamaa)
