= Faculty of Medicine, Ain Shams University =

Public Egyptian graduate school

Coordinates: 30.075928°N 31.281214°E

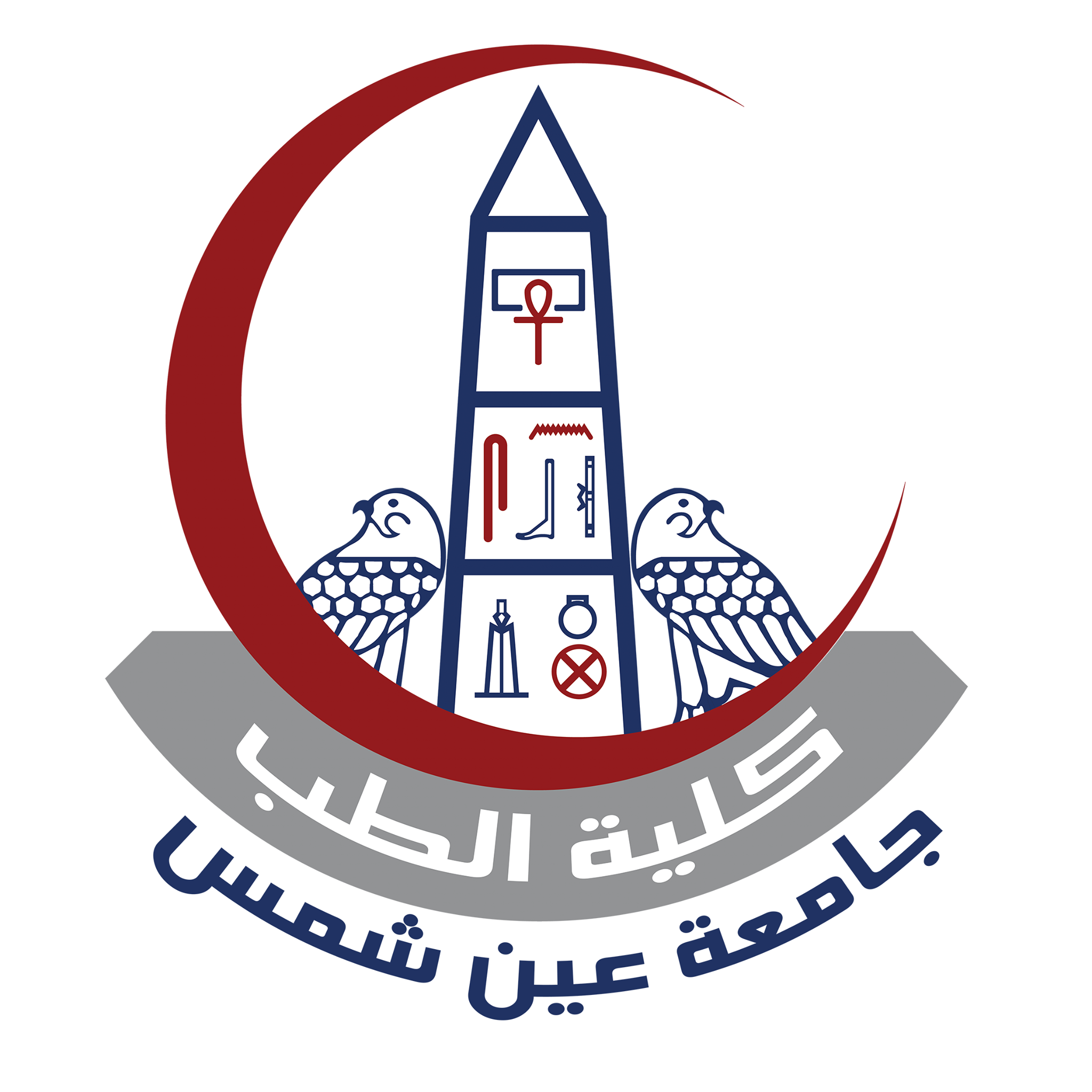
- Type: Public
- Established: 1947; 79 years ago
- Parent institution: Ain Shams University
- Accreditation: NAQAAE
- Dean: Prof. Dr Ali El Anwar
- Administrative staff: 2,500
- Undergraduates: 9000+
- Postgraduates: 3038
- Address: Abbassyia, Faculty of Medicine, 11566, Cairo, Egypt
- Campus: Abbassia, Cairo
- Website: med.asu.edu.eg

Ain Shams University, Faculty of Medicine or School of Medicine, is a public Egyptian graduate school and one of the faculties of Ain Shams University. Now, it is one of the largest educational medical institutions in Africa and the Middle East. It was founded in 1947, making it the third oldest medical school in Egypt. It has promoted numerous programs of medical care to serve society, in addition to environmental development and continuous scientific research for local and international health.

The university became part of Ain Shams University in 1950, when it was established after adding several faculty members. Each year, the faculty's different departments hold conferences dedicated to the recent advances in medical science.

== History ==
The school of medicine was called el-Demerdash School of Medicine, before establishment of the university. The original El-Demerdash Hospital was established on August 5, 1928, by a generous grant from El-Demerdash Pasha and his wife and daughter. It was built on 12,400 square metres, and had 90 beds and the following sections: quarters for a resident physician and chief nurse, two wards, a surgery unit, out-patient clinic, a laboratory, kitchen, laundry room, isolation ward, an autopsy department and a mosque containing the mausoleum for the El-Demerdash family. The foundation of the hospital was witnessed by many people representing all the society of Egypt and also by the two most powerful figures in the country in that time: Lord George Lloyd (later on George Lloyd, 1st Baron Lloyd), the British high commissioner, and Prime Minister of Egypt Mohamed Mahmoud Pasha. The opening ceremony was covered by Al Ahram, The Times and the Near East journals. It was officially opened on May 5, 1931. A memorial metallic plate and a marble monument were erected to mark this event.

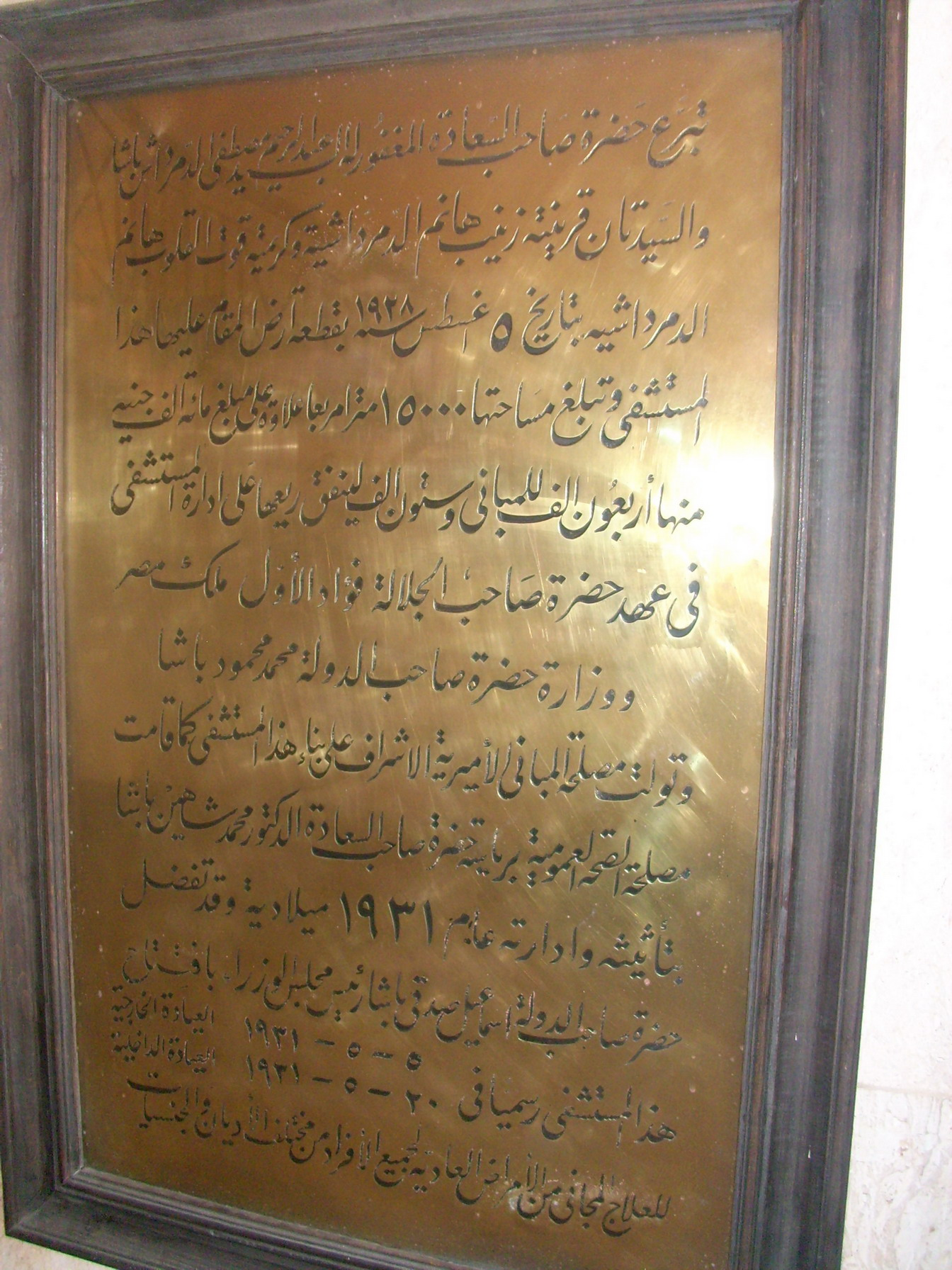
El Demerdash Hospital Establishment Plate,

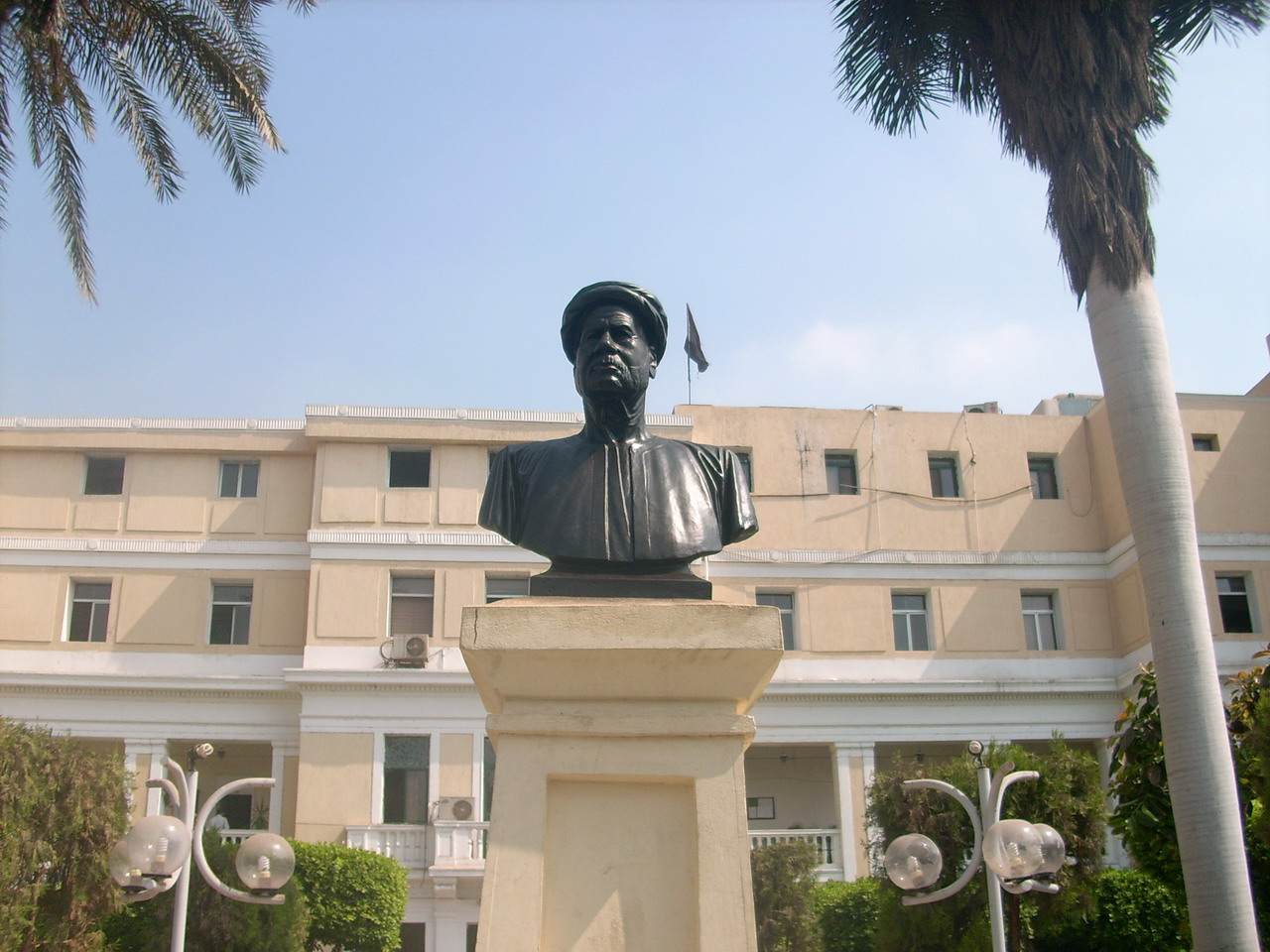
Statue of El-Demerdash Pasha,

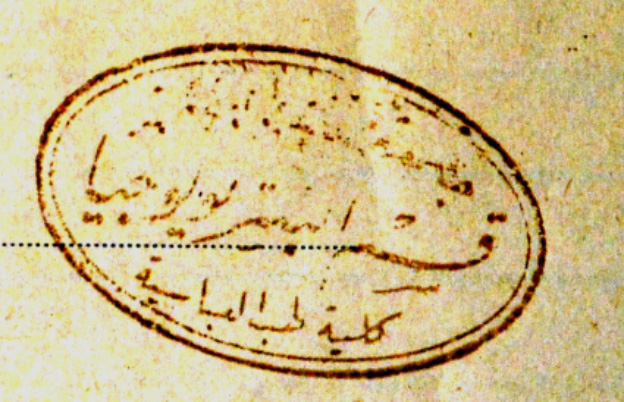
Stamp of Abbassia Faculty of medicine- Ibrahim Pasha University (1950-1952) on Microbiology examination booklet,

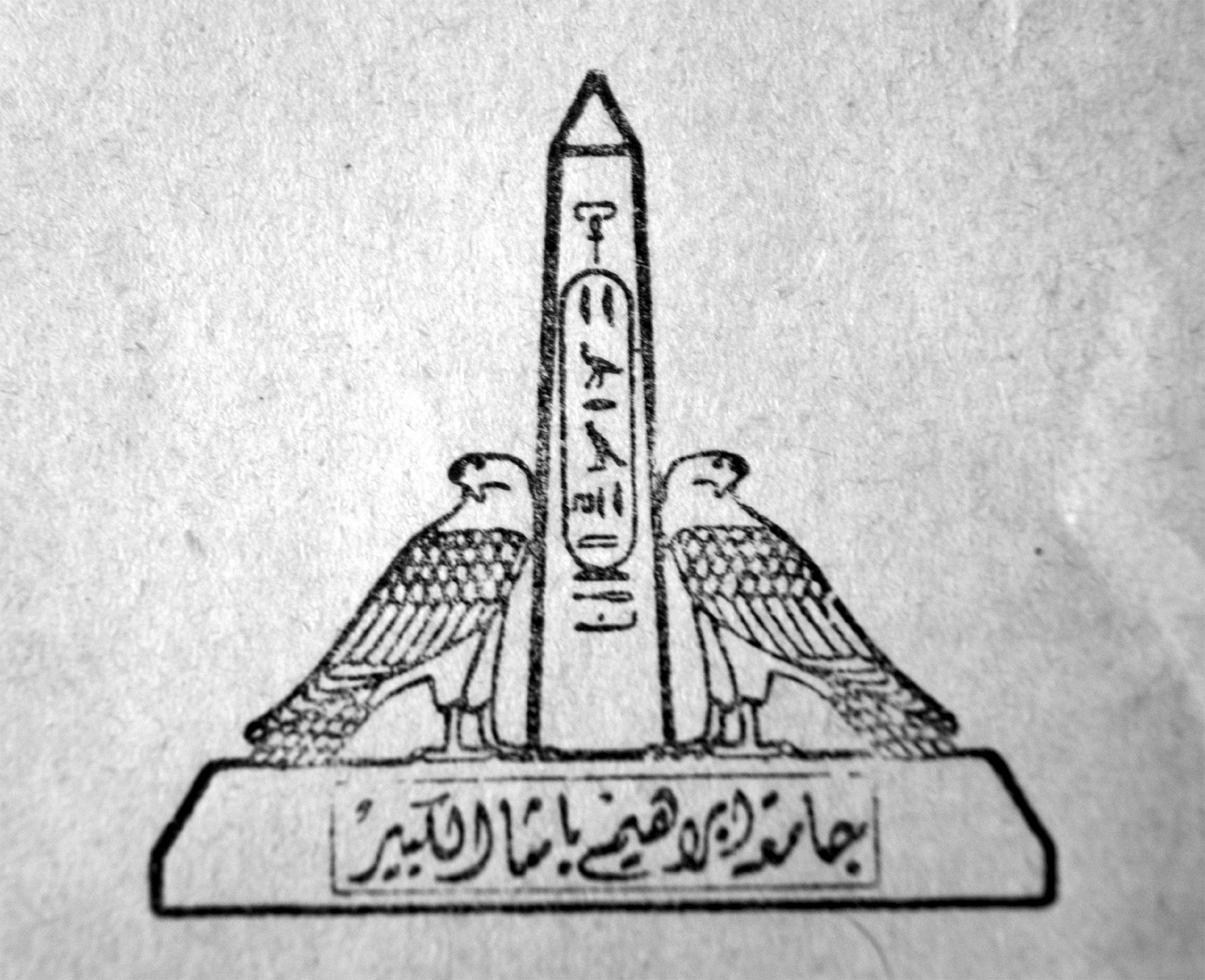
Ibrahim Pasha University Logo (1950-1952).

The translation of the metallic plate is:

"The honourable late Pasha Abdel-Rahim Moustafa El-Demerdash (may he have all God's forgiveness) and the two ladies his wife Zainab Hanem El-Demerdashiah and his daughter Qout Alqoulob Hanem El-Demerdashiah have donated—on the 5th of August 1928—by the piece of land on which this Hospital was erected which is 15,000 meter square, and donated the sum of 100,000 Egyptian Royal Pounds to be divided as 40,000 for the building of the hospital and 60,000 to be put into a Waqf and its benefits are dedicated to the expenses of running the hospital."

Ain Shams University, as the third Egyptian university, was founded in July 1950 under the name of "Ibrahim Pasha University". It participated with the two earlier universities (Cairo University - then named Fua'd the 1st - and Alexandria University - then named Farouk the 1st) in fulfilling the message of universities and meeting the increasing demand of youth for higher education. When it was first established, Ain Shams University comprised a number of distinguished faculties and academic institutes, which were later developed into university. After the revolution of July 23, 1952, it was suggested that Egyptian universities be given names that were strongly linked with the roots and historical landmarks of the country. Thus on February 21, 1954, the name of the university was changed to "Heliopolis" ("City of the Sun"), and then changed in the same year to its present name "Ain Shams" ("Eye of the Sun").

== Reputation and rankings ==
Over the years, the faculty has been regularly featured in international rankings, such as (as of 2024):

- ARWU: 301-400
- QS: 297
- THE: 401-500
- US News: 354

== Campus ==
The faculty of medicine with its hospitals is located in Abbassyia district of Cairo governorate, situated between Ahmed Lotfy El Sayed Street and Ramses Street. The campus consists of four buildings, in addition to educational hospitals, outpatient clinics, administration, a library, scientific societies and some medical units.
In 2022, two adjacent public parks were added to the campus as part of the "Ain Shams University Medical City" project.

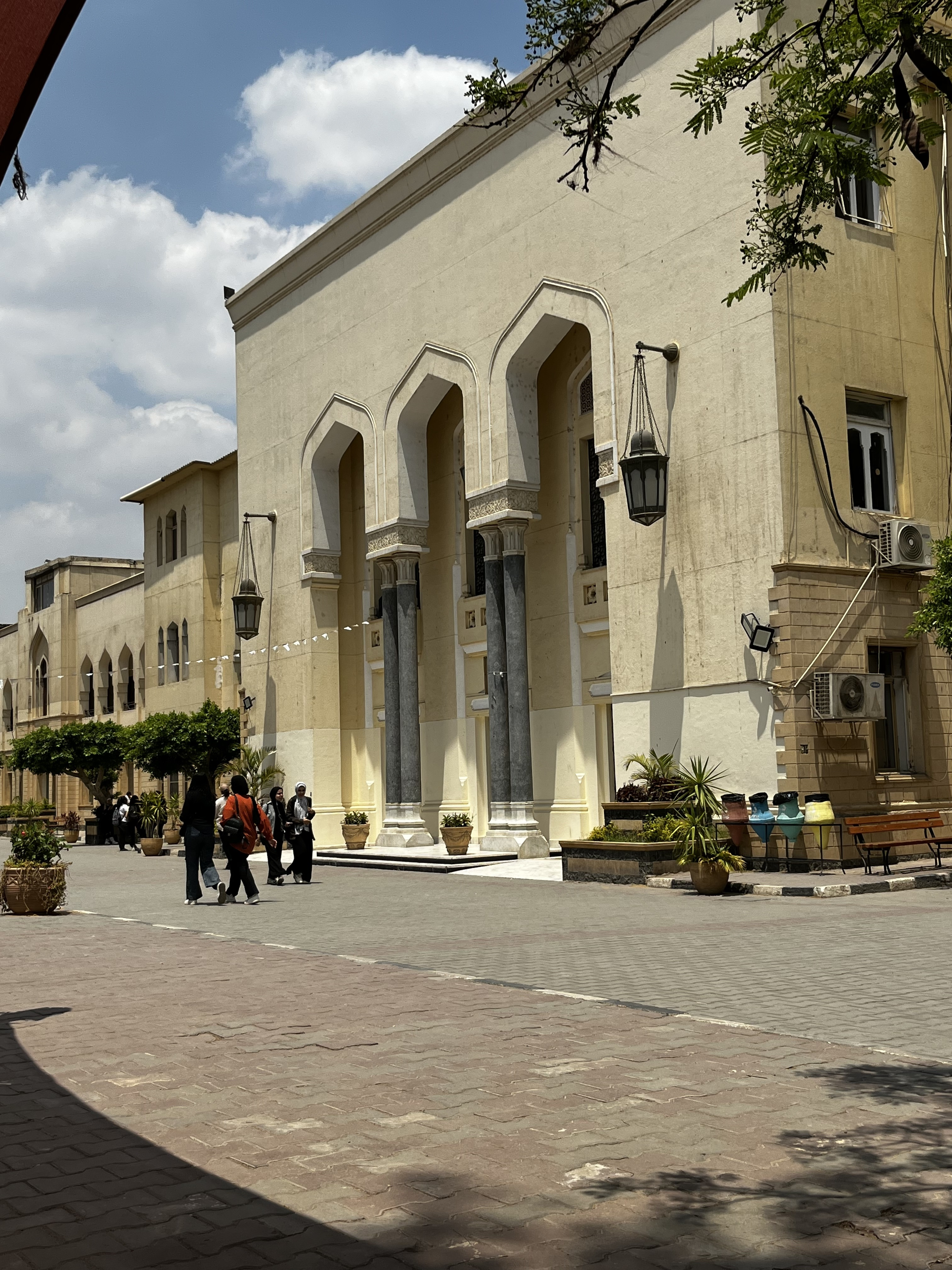
Building A, the oldest one on campus.

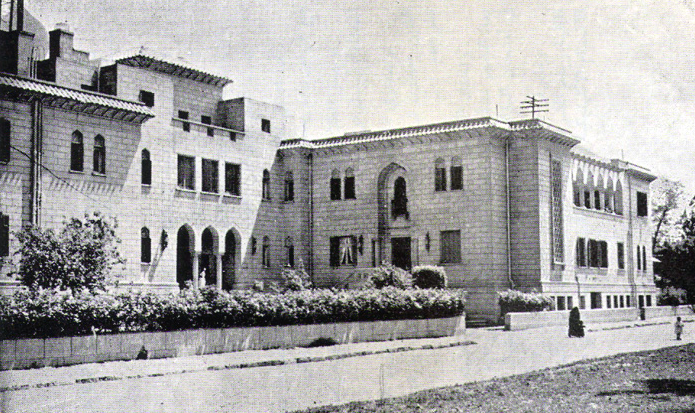
Children's Hospital, Ain Shams University - Old building built 1933. Now, another, newer pediatric hospital is situated behind it, with a third being built adjacent to it.

== Programs Offered ==
- Undergraduate Degrees
  - Bachelor of Medicine, Bachelor of Surgery (Mainstream Program) - The usual and most common degree offered by medical schools in Egypt.
  - Bachelor of Medicine, Bachelor of Surgery (Extended Modular Program) - Similar to the mainstream program, but with much smaller number of students and an overall more premium experience. Its tuition fees are more than 100 times that of the mainstream program.
- Postgraduate Degrees
  - The Faculty offers Master's, Doctorate degrees, as well as diplomas given by all its different departments.

== School Hospitals and Associated Institutes ==
Demerdash hospitals include 10 hospitals and medical centers in all general and subspecialties, a medical research center and 3,430 beds. It consists of the following hospitals:

- Obstetrics and gynaecology Hospital
- Pediatrics Hospitals (two existing, and a third under construction)
- Surgery Hospital
- Internal Medicine Hospital
- Geriatrics Hospital (Martyr Ahmed Shawky Hospital)
- The Academic Institute for Cardiac Surgery
- Emergency Hospital (under construction as of July 2023)
- Okasha Institute of Psychiatry
- Poison Control Center
- Oncology and Nuclear medicine Center
- Genetic Diseases Center
- Blood Bank
- The Technical Institute for Nursing
- Ain Shams University Faculty of Nursing

== Departments ==
The school comprises 10 Academic departments that are located in the campus, distributed between Buildings A and C. They include:

- Anatomy
- Histology
- Biochemistry
- Physiology
- Pharmacology
- Pathology
- Parasitology
- Microbiology
- Community Medicine (Community, Environmental & Occupational Medicine)
- Forensic and Toxicology.

All of the 21 clinical departments are located in the university hospitals, including the 6 major Clinical departments (Ophthalmology, Ear, Nose and Throat (ENT), Internal medicine, Tropical medicine, Surgery, Obstetrics & Gynecology and Pediatrics).

== Notable faculty graduates ==
- Prof Ahmed Okasha, President of the Egyptian Psychiatric Association and President of World Psychiatric Association (WPA) from 2002 through 2005
- Prof Ahmed Samy Khalifa, pediatric hematologist who was given the National Encouragement Award in Medical Sciences in 1982, and the National Recognition Award in Advanced Technological Sciences in 1998.
- Prof Paul Ghalioungui, Egyptian-Greek internist and medical history writer (Arabic and Pharonic)

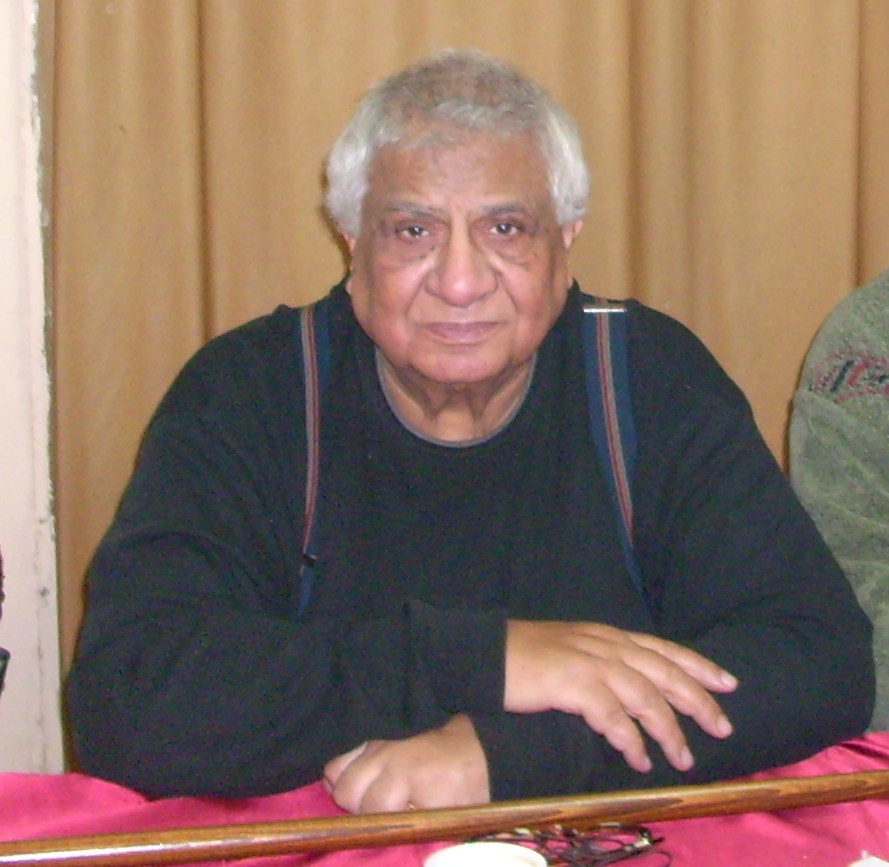
Prof Abdel-Moniem Ashour in 2010 (1934-2015)

- Prof Abdel Moniem Ashour (1934-2015), psychogeriatrician, one of the founders of the International Psychogeriatrics Association (IPA), writer and founder of the Al-Zehimer Egypt Association.
- Prof Hamdy El-Sayed, head of Parliament's Health Committee and Chairman of the Egyptian Doctors' Syndicate
- Prof Mohammed Awad Tagg Eldin, respiratory disease professor and former Minister of Health
- Prof Maher Mahran, obstetrician, former Minister for Population and Family Welfare, and former Secretary General of the National Population Council of Egypt
- Prof Ismael Sallam, cardiothoracic surgeon and former Minister of Health and Population from 1996 until 2002, one of the nine candidates for the position of World Health Organization Director-General
- Prof Samy Azer, Professor of Medical Education focusing on Medical Education and Problem-Based Learning in Australia, Malaysia, Taiwan, Japan, and the USA *Biography. Who's Who in America.
- Prof Yehia El-Gamal Professor of Pediatrics.
- Prof Strauss El-Hauzer Kahn, Author of Believe in Better and leader of the Young Brother Movement
- Prof Mahmoud Hassan Maamoun former professor of Internal Medicine and head of the Internal Medicine Department. Discovered Mamoun's Sign, a preliminary Kidney cancer diagnosis.
- Prof. Mamdouh Mohamed Salama, the first neurosurgery resident in Egypt and the founder of the neurosurgery unit and department in the hospital and the faculty

== Gallery ==
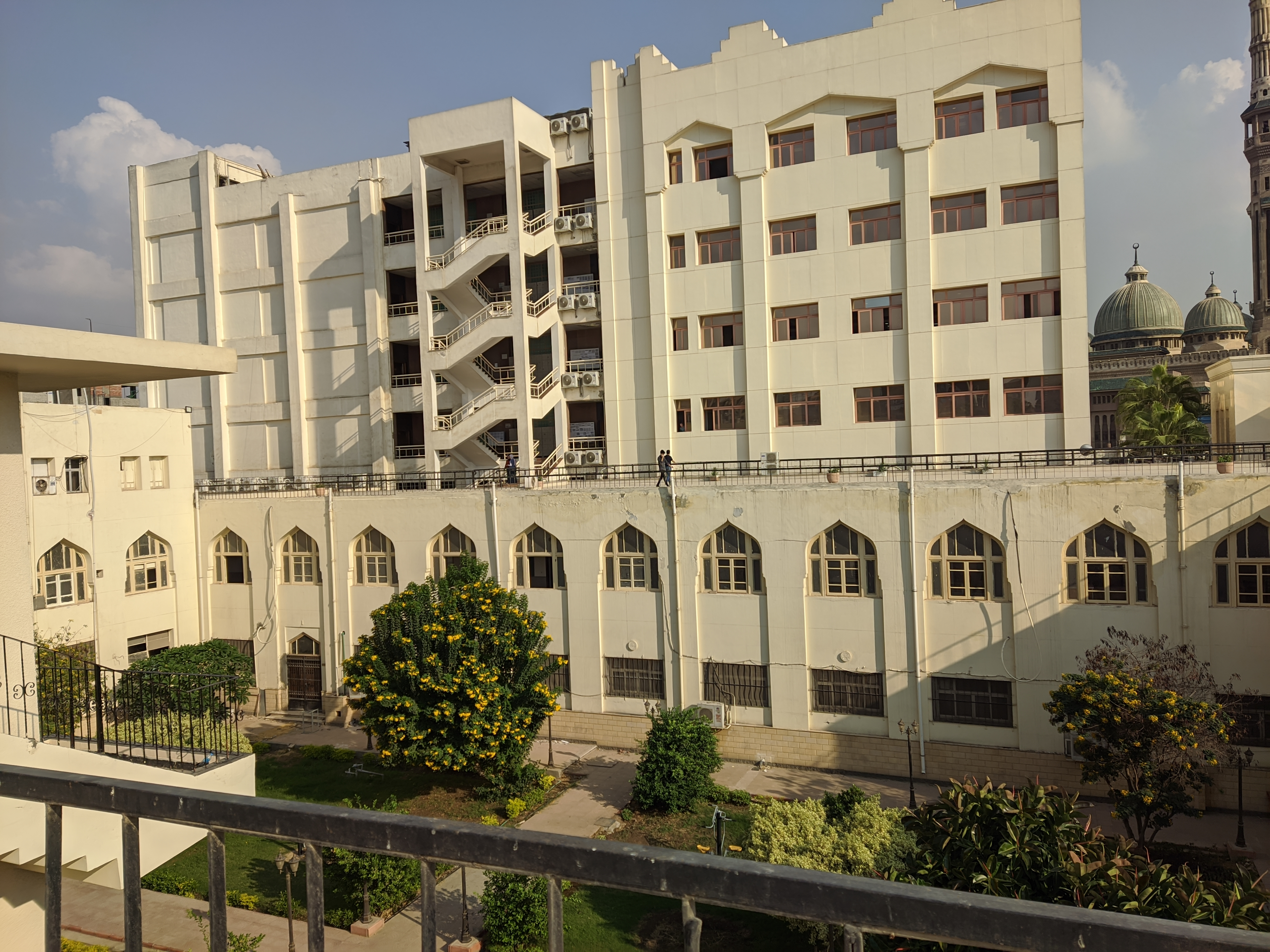
Building B, which houses three two-floor lecture halls for students in the first three years, in addition to examination halls. The minarets in the background are those of Al Nour Mosque.

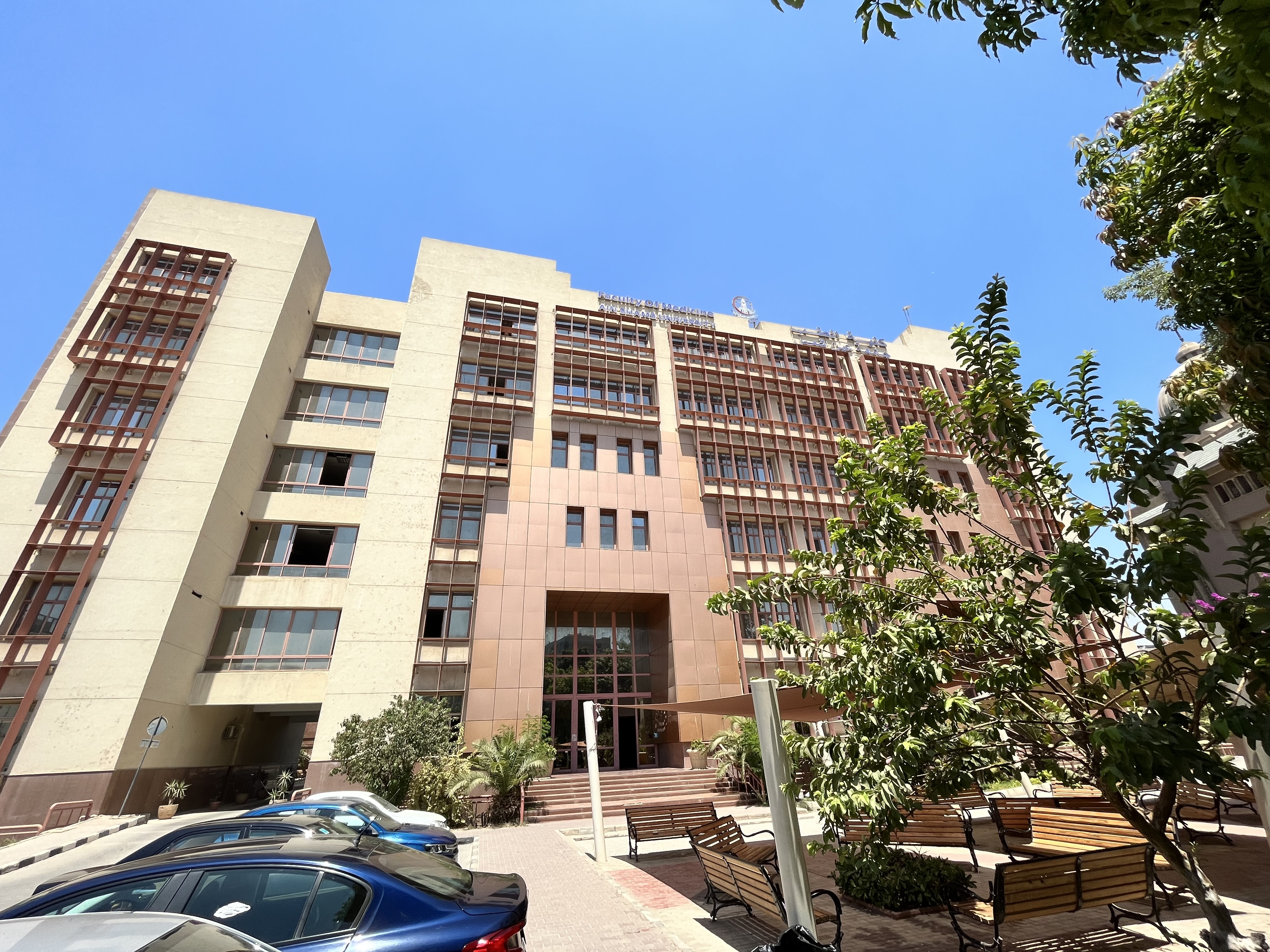
Building C, which houses five of ten basic sciences departments.

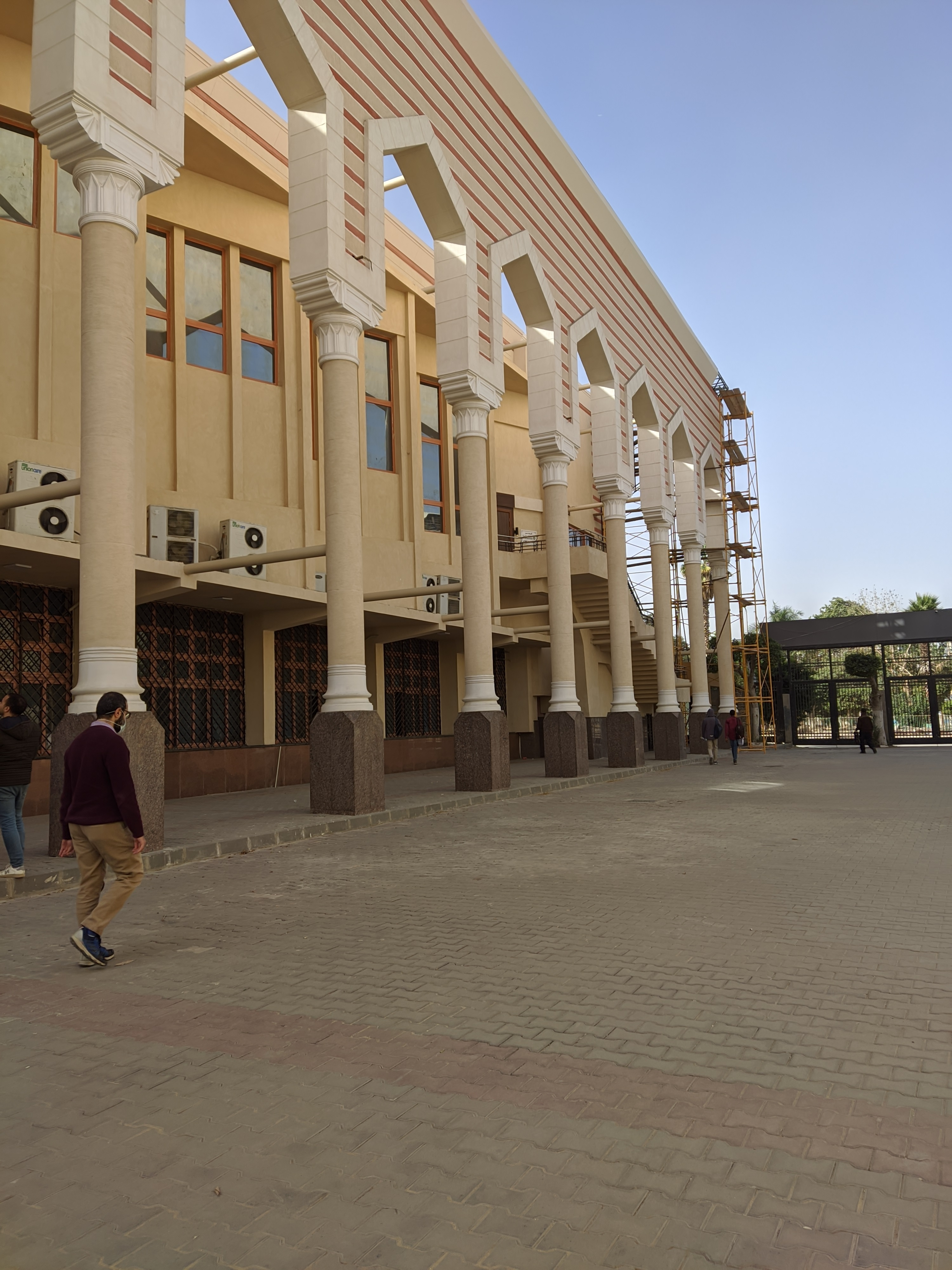
Building D, mostly used for hosting events.

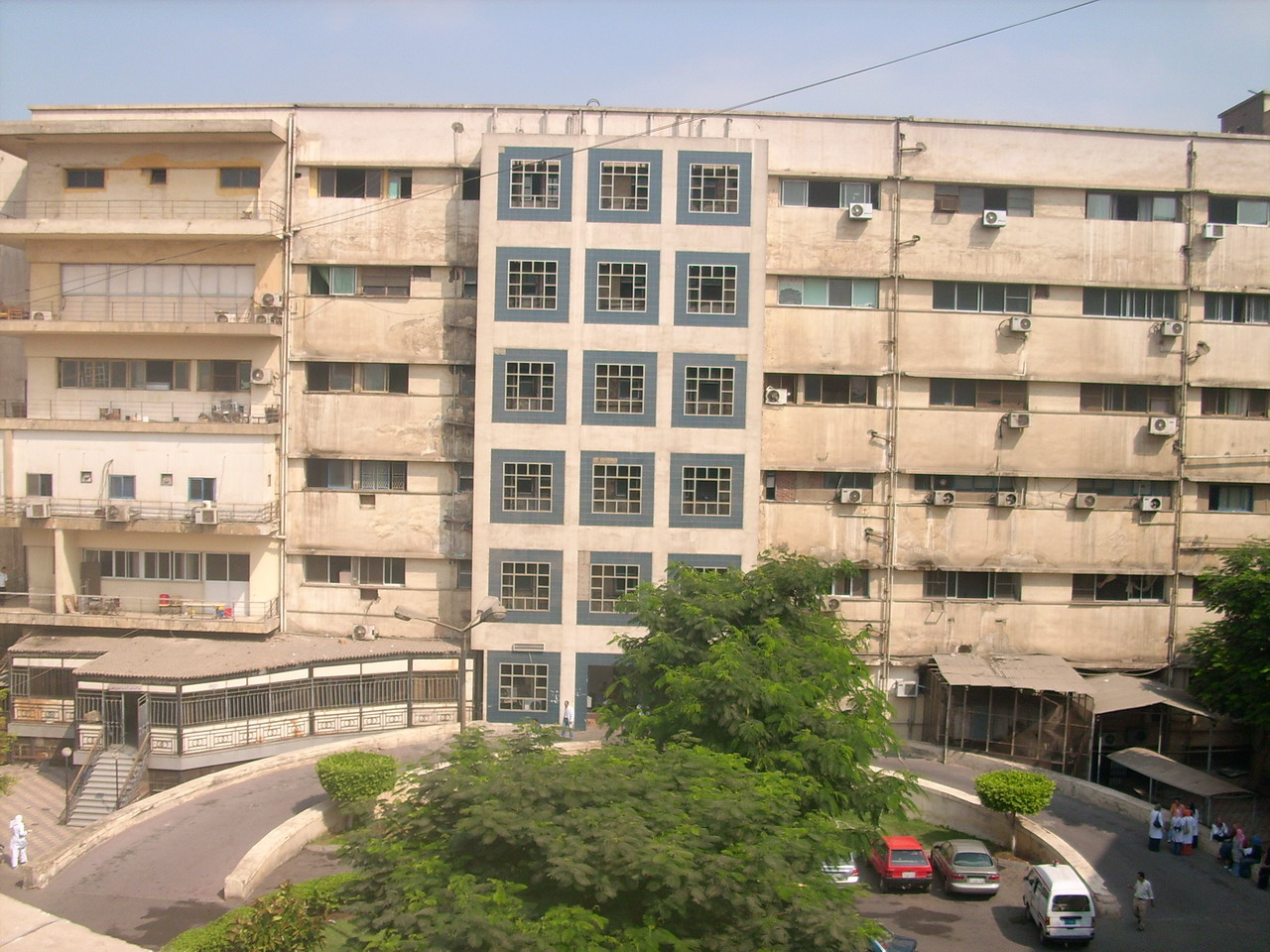
Old ER building, pictured in 2008.

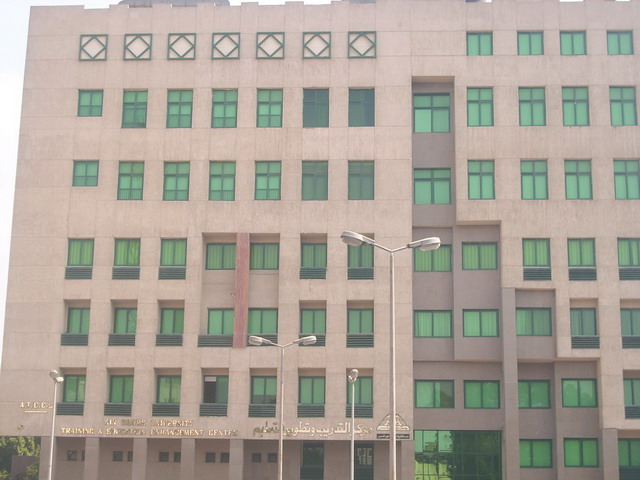
Training and Education Enhancement Center
Example 1
