= Huda El-Mufti =

Egyptian actress

- هدى المفتي
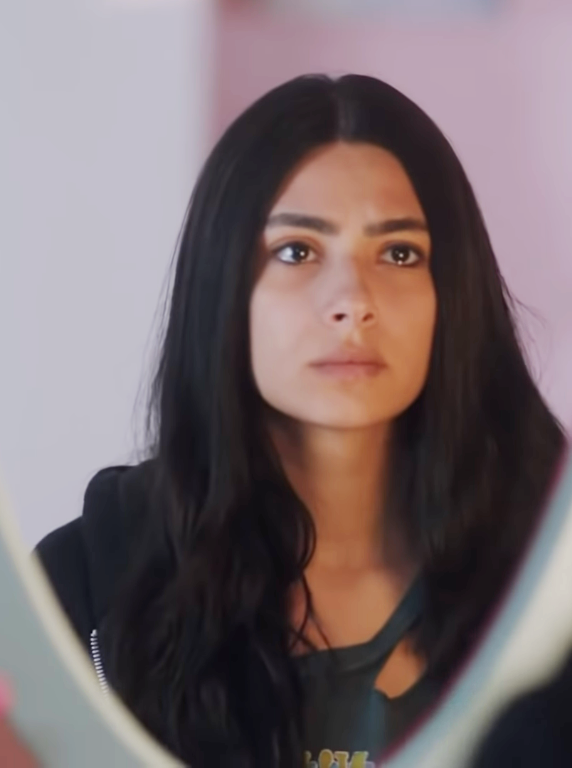
- Born: December 6, 1994 (age 31); Cairo, Egypt
- Education: Ain Shams University
- Occupations: Actress, model
- Years active: 2017–present

Huda El-Mufti (Arabic: هدى المفتي) is an Egyptian actress and model.

== Biography ==
Born in Cairo, Huda El-Mufti graduated from the Faculty of Arts, Department of Drama and Theater Criticism, and began her career at the age of seventeen by appearing in a number of commercials. She then moved into acting by participating in the series "This Evening" (ar:هذا المساء (مسلسل)) in 2017. Her success in the role of Nadine in the series drew attention to her, and she was subsequently offered roles in drama and cinema. In 2018, she starred in the series "As If It Was Yesterday" (ar:كأنه إمبارح) in the role of Lina, which left a positive impression on her. She also participated in the series "We Have Other Sayings" (ar:لدينا أقوال أخرى (مسلسل)) and in 2019, she participated in the third season of the series "My Fate and Your Destiny 3" (ar:نصيبي وقسمتك 3 (مسلسل)).

The year 2020 witnessed her cinematic launch, as her first cinematic participation was in the film "New Year's Eve" (ar:رأس السنة (فيلم)) and she played the character of Sireen in the movie "High School Girls" (ar:بنات ثانوي (فيلم)), alongside Jamila Awad and Mayan El Sayed, which tells the story of five high school girls, with her playing the role of a spoiled girl who pushes her father to work like crazy to provide for her.

El-Mufti's latest work is the series "Valentino" (ar:فلانتينو (مسلسل)) with the artist Adel Emam shown in the Ramadan 2020 season, while she awaits the screening of the fantasy comedy film "Dido" (ar:ديدو (فيلم)). During the current year, as well as the movie "Kira & El Gin" (ar:كيرة والجن) which brings together the work team led by director Marwan Hamed and starring Karim Abdel Aziz, Ahmed Ezz, Hend Sabry, and Ahmed Malek.

In 2024 Al-Mufti was appointed as Dolce & Gabbana’s first regional ambassador in the Middle East, further advancing her modeling career.

== Selected filmography ==
- 2020: Banat Sanawy
- 2020: New Year's Eve
- 2021: Dido
- 2021: Trial Version
- 2022: Kira and El Gin
- 2022: Amohom
- 2022: Bahebek
- 2022: Hazak El-Yom
- 2023: Shamarikh
- 2024: Badaa Saat Fi Yawman Ma
