= Ahmed Samy Khalifa =

Egyptian pediatric hematologist and oncologist (1933–2015)

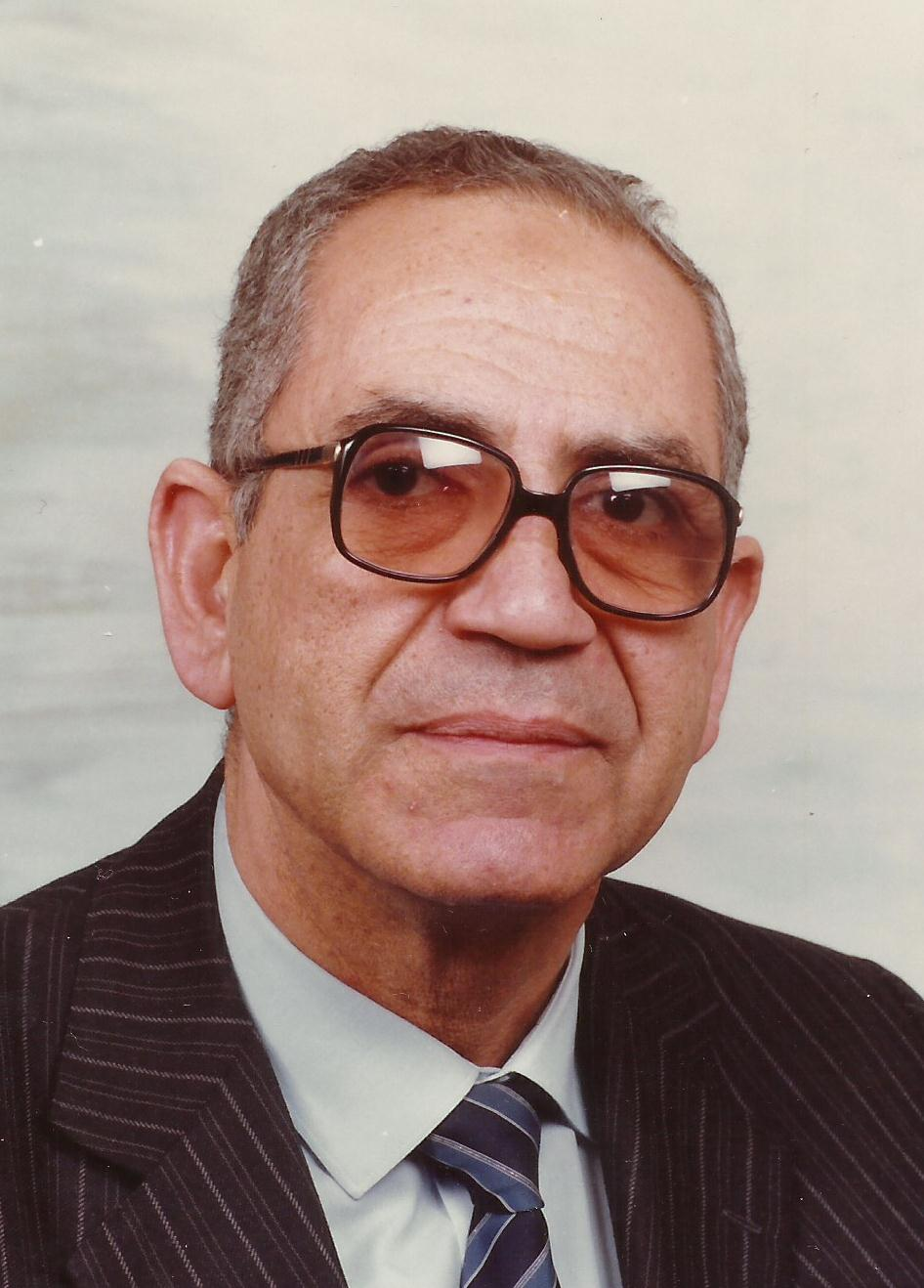
Professor Ahmed Sami Khalifa, Professor of Pediatrics, Ain Shams University

Ahmed Samy Khalifa (14 November 1933 – 14 August 2015) was an Egyptian pediatric hematologist and oncologist. He established the specialty of Pediatric Hematology/Oncology at Ain Shams University. He treated thousands of children with thalassemia, leukemia and other hematologic and ontological diseases all over Egypt.

== Education ==
He received a Bachelor of Medicine and Surgery in (1957) from Cairo University, followed by a Diploma in Pediatrics (1959), a diploma in Internal Medicine (1960), an MD in Pediatrics (1961), and a Diploma in Physiology and Biochemistry (1964), all from Cairo University. He was certified by the American Board of Pediatrics in 1974.

== Scientific career ==
- doctor privilege from 01/03/1957 to 28/02/1958 - Cairo University Hospitals.
- resident doctor from 10/04/1958 to 04/09/1960 - Children's Hospital and the paralysis Institute of Cairo University.
- A. Lecturer of pediatrics from 18/08/1960 to 07/19/1964 - Department of Pediatrics - Faculty of Medicine - Ain Shams University.
- Lecturer of pediatrics from 19/07/1964 until 10/21/1969 Department of Pediatrics - Faculty of Medicine - Ain Shams University.
- Associate professor of pediatrics from 10/21/1969 until 10/25/1974 Department of Pediatrics - Faculty of Medicine - Ain Shams University.
- Professor of pediatrics from 10/25/1974.
- Head of the Department of Pediatrics from 01/08/1991 until 31/07/1994.
- Professor Emeritus of Pediatrics from 08/01/1994 until 14/08/2015.

== Scientific education ==
- Created the pediatric Clinic Hematology and Oncology, Department of Pediatrics - Faculty of Medicine - Ain Shams University in December 1974, after his return from the United States as a therapeutic progress of the Egyptian society and friendly countries and education for physicians in diagnosis and treatment.
- Visiting professor at the University of Wayne, Michigan - United States of America.
- External examiner at the Faculty of Medicine Dubai, United Arab Emirates and the Faculty of Medicine of the University of Jordan.

== Awards ==
- Holder on Nishan Republic in Science and the State Incentive Award in 1982.
- Recipient of the State Award in Medical Sciences in 1998.

== Membership of scientific committees ==
- He was a member of the Standing Committee of Pediatrics in different periods.
- was a member of the arbitration committee for the State Incentive Awards and discretion.

== Supervised theses ==
- 85 Master in pediatric hematology and oncology in children has vacationed.
- 62 M.D. thesis in pediatric hematology and oncology in children has vacationed.

== Research ==
- Published 219 research in local and international journals.
- Authored chapter on "Anemia in Mothers and Children in Developing Countries" in '' Maternal Child health around the World'' (1981) H.M Wallace and G.L. Ebrahim (editors) MacMillen Press London.
- Authored chapter "Exchange Transfusion: Metabolic aspects biochemical changes" in '' Paediatrics and Blood Transfusion'' (1992) Smit sibinga, P.C.Das and J.O.Forfar (editors) Matinus Nijhoff. Publisher the Hague / Boston / London
- Wrote Protocols of therapy for oncological diseases in Pediatrics (2012)

== Membership of scientific societies ==
- Egyptian Society of Pediatrics.
- Egyptian Medical Association.
- Egyptian Society of Hematology.
- Clinical Society of Ain Shams.
- Egyptian Oncology Group in children.
- The Egyptian Cancer Society.
- Ain Shams Society of Medicine and the care of children.
- International Society of Hematology ISH.
- International Society of Pediatric Oncology
- American Society of Hematology (ASH).
- European Haematology Association (EHA).

== Scientific journals ==
- Editor-in-Chief of the Egyptian children.
