= Hani Azer =

Egyptian civil engineer

Hany Azer
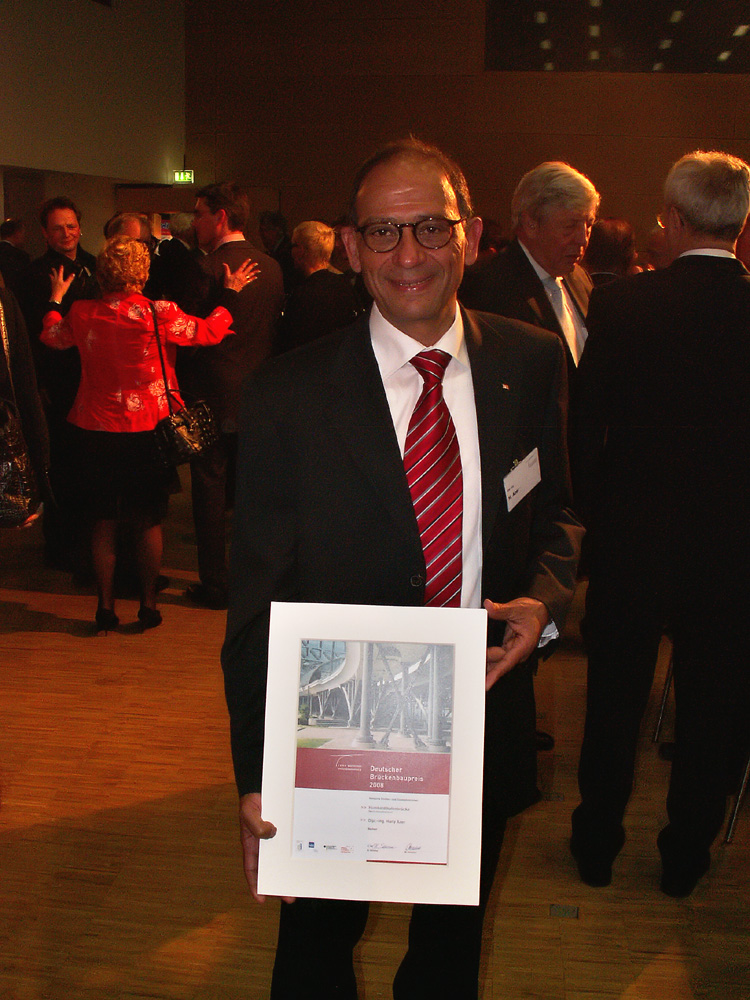
- Er.Ing. Hany Azer (March 2008)
- Born: 1949 (age 76–77); Tanta, Egypt
- Education: Faculty of Engineering, Ain Shams University, BSc (Engg)
- Engineering career
- Projects: Chief engineer of the Berlin Hauptbahnhof
- Awards: Verdienstorden des Landes Berlin (Merit of the State of Berlin)

Hany Azer (Coptic: Ϩⲁⲛⲓ Ⲁⲍⲉⲣ, Arabic: هاني عازر; born 1949) is an Egyptian-German civil engineer. He was born in Tanta, Egypt to a Coptic family and moved to Cairo for high school and university. In 1973, after earning a BSc(Engg) degree from the Faculty of Engineering, Ain Shams University, he moved to Germany to study for his post-graduate diploma in civil engineering in Bochum.

Azer headed the construction of the tunnel beneath Berlin's Tiergarten in 1994. Subsequently, he became the chief engineer of the Berlin Hauptbahnhof, Germany's fourth-largest train station. The station is a modernistic structure with a roof built almost entirely of glass blocks. The project cost $700 million. Berliners voted Azer 13th in the top 50 Berliners of the year in 2006.

Azer was honored by the German Chancellor Angela Merkel on 26 May 2006 at the inauguration of the Berlin Hauptbahnhof. He was also later honored by Egyptian president Hosni Mubarak. On 1 October 2006, Azer received one of Berlin's most respected distinctions, the Verdienstorden des Landes Berlin (Merit of the State of Berlin), for outstanding service to the state. Azer is also considered one of the top tunneling and bridge engineers at the global level today.
