= Ain Shams University =

Public university in Cairo, Egypt

Coordinates: 30°4′37″N 31°17′6″E

Ain Shams University جامعة عين شمس
- Horus, the embodiment of Highness and Egyptian Obelisk
- Type: Public
- Established: July 1950; 76 years ago
- Administrative staff: 11,590
- Undergraduates: 189,822
- Location: Cairo, Egypt
- Campus: Abbassia, Cairo
- Website: asu.edu.eg

Ain Shams University (Arabic: جامعة عين شمس, romanized: Jāmiʻat ʻAyn Shams) is a public university located in Cairo, Egypt. Founded in 1950, the university provides education at the undergraduate, graduate and post-graduate levels.

== History ==
Ain Shams University was founded in July 1950, the third-oldest non-sectarian native public Egyptian university (ancient Islamic universities such as Al-Azhar and private institutions such as the American University in Cairo are older), under the name of Ibrahim Pasha's University. Its site used to be a former royal palace, called the Zafarana Palace.

Zafarana Palace in Ain Shams University

The two earlier universities of this kind are Cairo University (Fuad I university formerly) and Alexandria University (Farouk I university formerly). When it was first established, Ain Shams University had a number of faculties and academic institutes, which were later developed into a university. The university's academic structure includes 21 faculties, and 1 high institute plus 12 centers and special units.

== Faculties and institutes ==
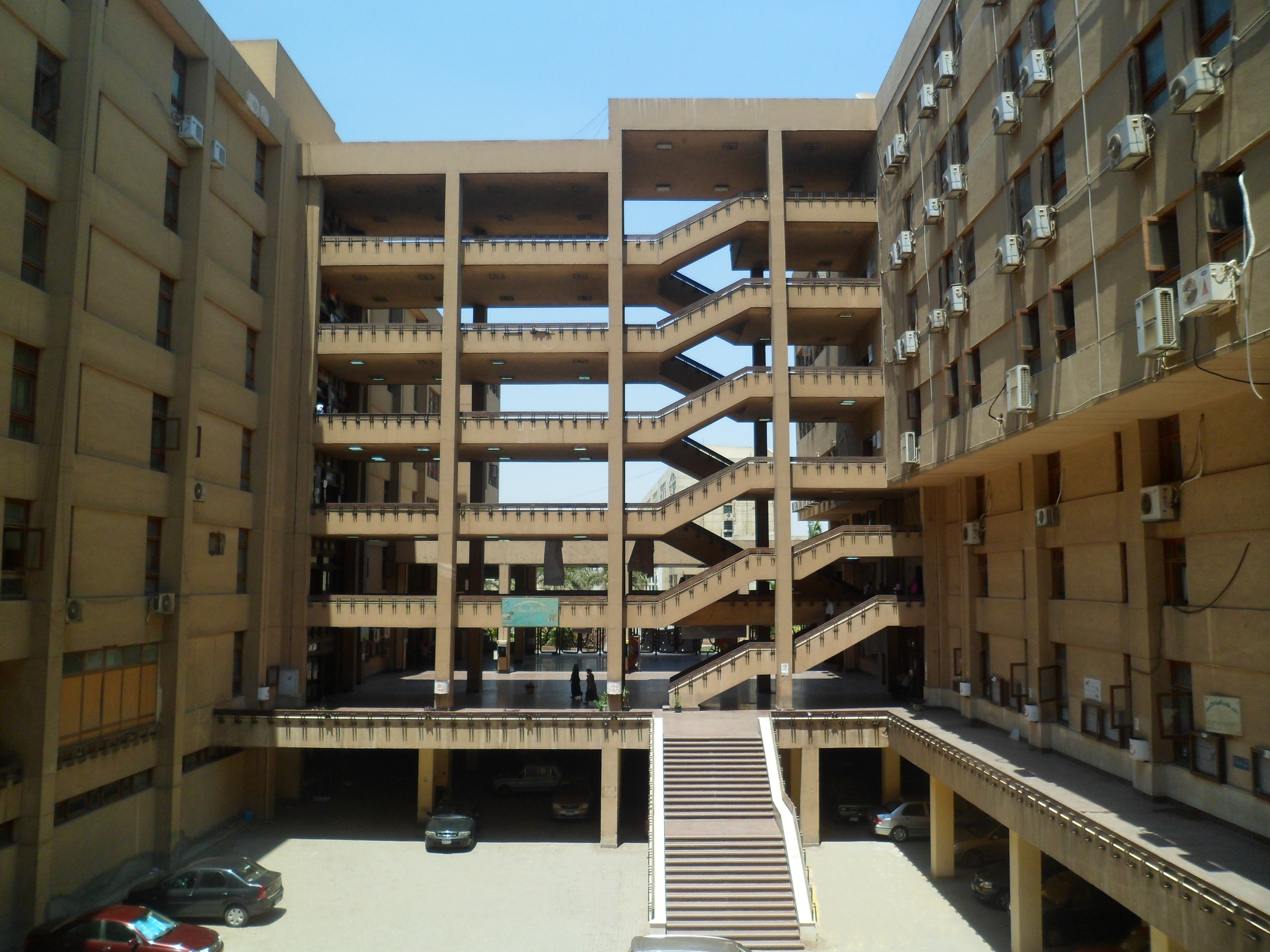
Faculty of Alsun

Faculty of Engineering

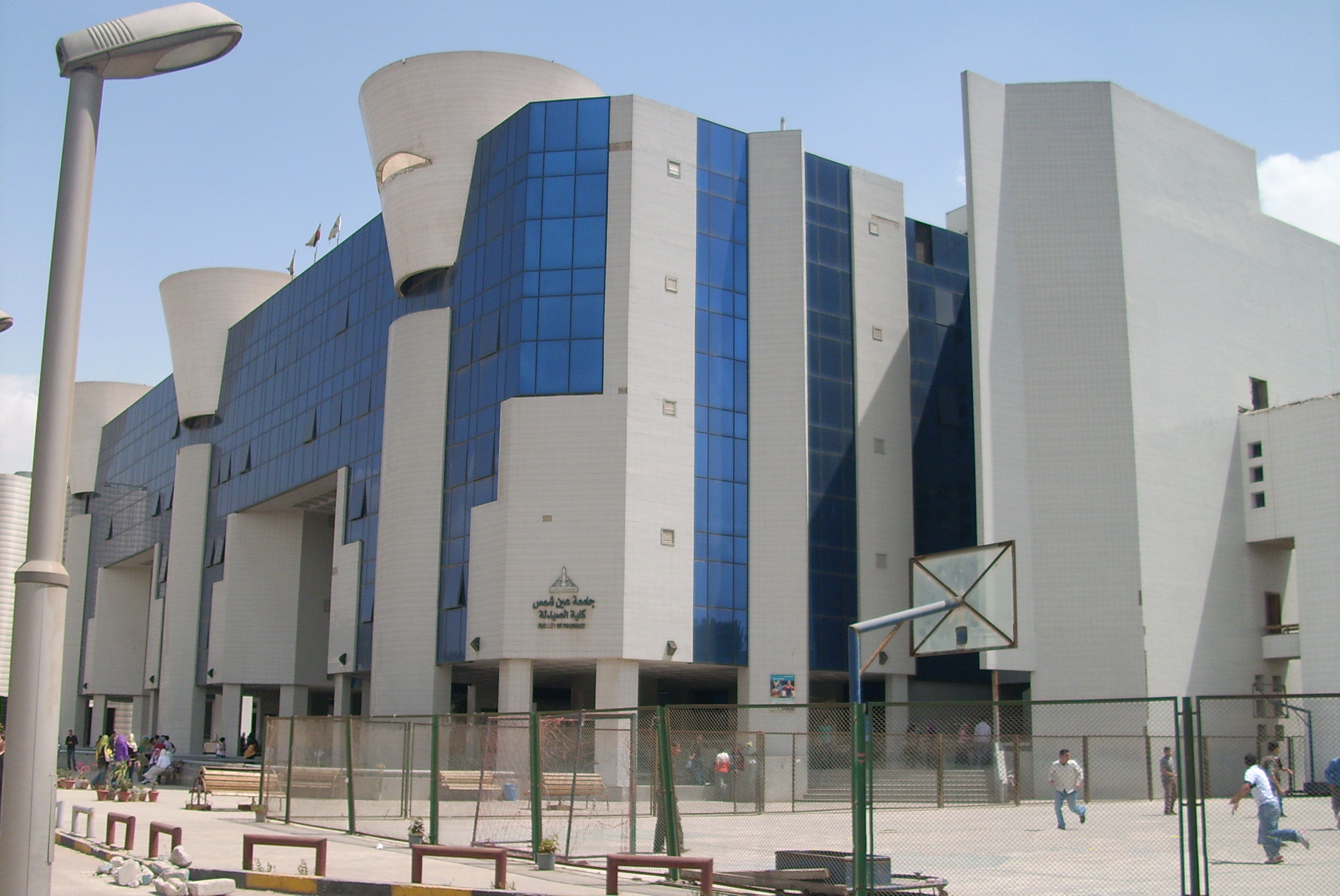
Faculty of Pharmacy

Currently, Ain Shams University offers degrees from 21 different faculties:

- Faculty of Medicine
- Faculty of Science
- Faculty of Pharmacy
- Faculty of Computer and Information Sciences
- Faculty of Dentistry
- Faculty of Engineering
- Faculty of Business
- Faculty of Al-Alsun
- Faculty of Education
- Faculty of Law
- Faculty of Agriculture
- Faculty of Specific Education
- Faculty of Women
- Faculty of Arts
- Faculty of Nursing
- Faculty of Postgraduate Childhood Studies
- Faculty of Graduate Studies and Environment Research
- Faculty of Archaeology
- Arid Land Agricultural Research Institute
- Faculty of Veterinary Medicine
- Faculty of Media and Mass Communication

== Campuses ==
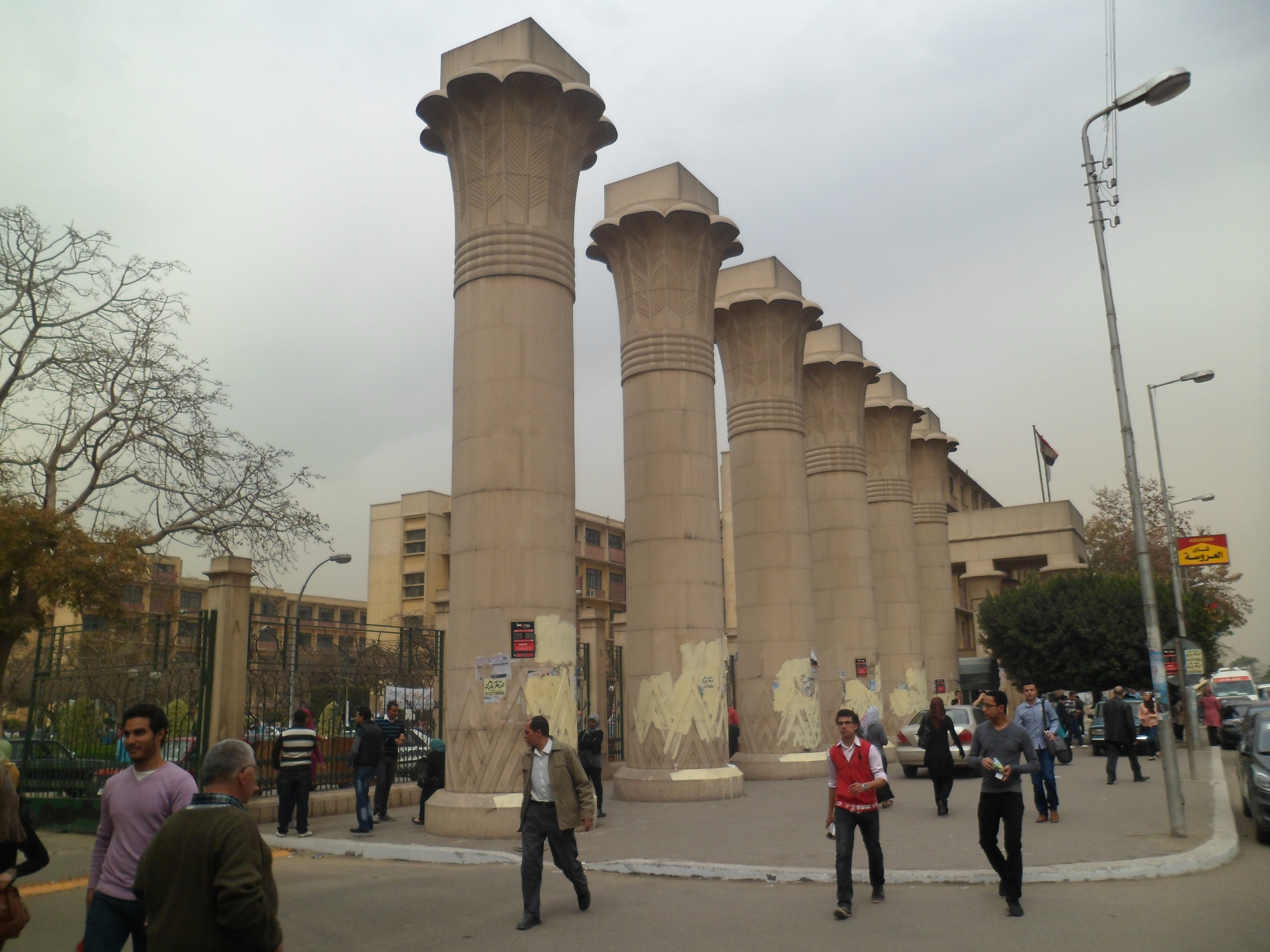
Main gate

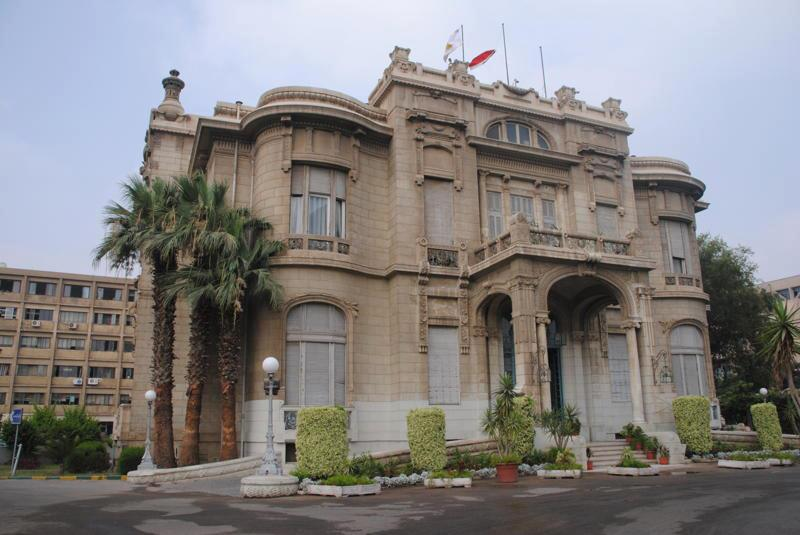
Management building

Ain Shams University has eight campuses. Two of them are next to each other, separated by a main road named El-Khalifa El-Maamoun; all of them are in Greater Cairo.

The main campus is in Abbassia, Cairo and houses the Administration and Management at the Saffron Palace, Science Education Development Center, Central Library, Child Hood Center and the University City (students hostel), in addition to the faculties of Computer Science, Science, Law and Art. The opposite Campus houses the faculty of Commerce, Alsun, pharmaceutical Science and Dentistry.

The Women's College has its own campus. Faculty of Specific Education, Faculty of Education, and Faculty of Agriculture are each on separate campuses in Abassia, Heliopolis, and Shubra El Kheima, respectively.

== Popular culture ==
In 2012, Misr International films was producing a television series based on the novel Zaat by Sonallah Ibrahim. Filming of scenes set at Ain Shams University was scheduled to occur that year, but Muslim Brotherhood student members and some teachers at the school protested, stating that the 1970s era clothing worn by the actresses was indecent and would not allow filming unless the clothing was changed. Gaby Khoury, the head of the film company, stated that engineering department head Sherif Hammad "insisted that the filming should stop and that we would be reimbursed, explaining that he was not able to guarantee the protection of the materials or the artists."

== Rankings ==
University rankings

Global – Overall
- ARWU World: 601–700 (2023)
- CWUR World: 769 (2024)
- CWTS World: 537 (2021)
- QS World: =542 (2026)
- THE World: 1100 (2022)
- USNWR Global: 540 (2023)

Regional – Overall
- THE Africa: =33 (2021)
- USNWR Africa: 13 (2022)

National – Overall
- ARWU National: 3 (2021)
- CWTS National: 2 (2020)
- CWUR National: 2 (2020–21)
- QS National: 3 (2021)
- THE National: 13 (2021)
- USNWR National: 3 (2021)

Ain Shams University is considered among the universities that are present in all international classifications, which makes it one of the best 3% of the world's universities.

== People ==
=== Notable faculty ===
- Mervat Seif el-Din (born 1954), classical archaeologist and former director of the Graeco-Roman Museum
- Abd El Aziz Muhammad Hegazi (1923–2014), Prime Minister of Egypt during the presidency of Anwar Sadat
- Abdel Rahman Badawi (1917–2002), professor of philosophy and poet
- Aisha Abd al-Rahman (1913–1998), Egyptian author and professor of literature (pen name: Bint al-Shati)

=== Notable alumni ===
- Rashad al-Alimi (born 1954), Chairman of the Presidential Leadership Council of Yemen
- Hani Azer (born 1948), civil engineer
- Jamal Badawi, preacher and speaker on Islam
- Farouk El-Baz (born 1938), space scientist
- Charles Butterworth (born 1938), American philosopher
- Farouk El-Fishawy (1952–2019), actor
- Mauro Hamza (born 1965 or 1966), fencing coach
- Sherif Ismail (born 1955), Prime minister of Egypt
- Fathulla Jameel (1942–2012), Minister of Foreign Affairs of Maldives
- Rashad Khalifa (born 1935), biochemist, Founder of the United Submitters International
- Youssef Maaty (born 1963), playwright
- Abdel Latif Moubarak (born 1964), poet
- Huda El-Mufti (born 1994), actress
- Ebrahim Nafae (1934–2018), journalist and newspaper editor
- Aida Seif el-Dawla (born 1954), human rights activist
- Fathy El Shazly (born 1943), Ambassador of Egypt to Saudi Arabia and Turkey
- Sameh Shoukry (born 1952), Ambassador of Egypt to the United States
- Ammar El Sherei (1948–2012), composer
- Fatima Naoot (born 1964), poet and translator
- Amani Al Tawil, reporter, researcher and an expert on Sudan
- Omar Touray (born 1965), Gambian diplomat
- Kenan Yaghi, Finance Minister of Syria (2020–2024)
- Ahmed Zulfikar (1952–2010), entrepreneur
- Hadia Hosny, badminton player
- Sa'ada Al-Dajani, Judge and lawyer
- Ekmeleddin İhsanoğlu (born 1943), Turkish academic, politician and diplomat
- Taha El Sherif Ben Amer, Minister of Transport of Libya

== See also ==
- List of Islamic educational institutions
- Education in Egypt
- Egyptian universities
- List of Egyptian universities
