= Ta'ziyeh =

Shia Islam ritual that reenacts the death of Husayn

Ta'ziyeh Shabih-khani
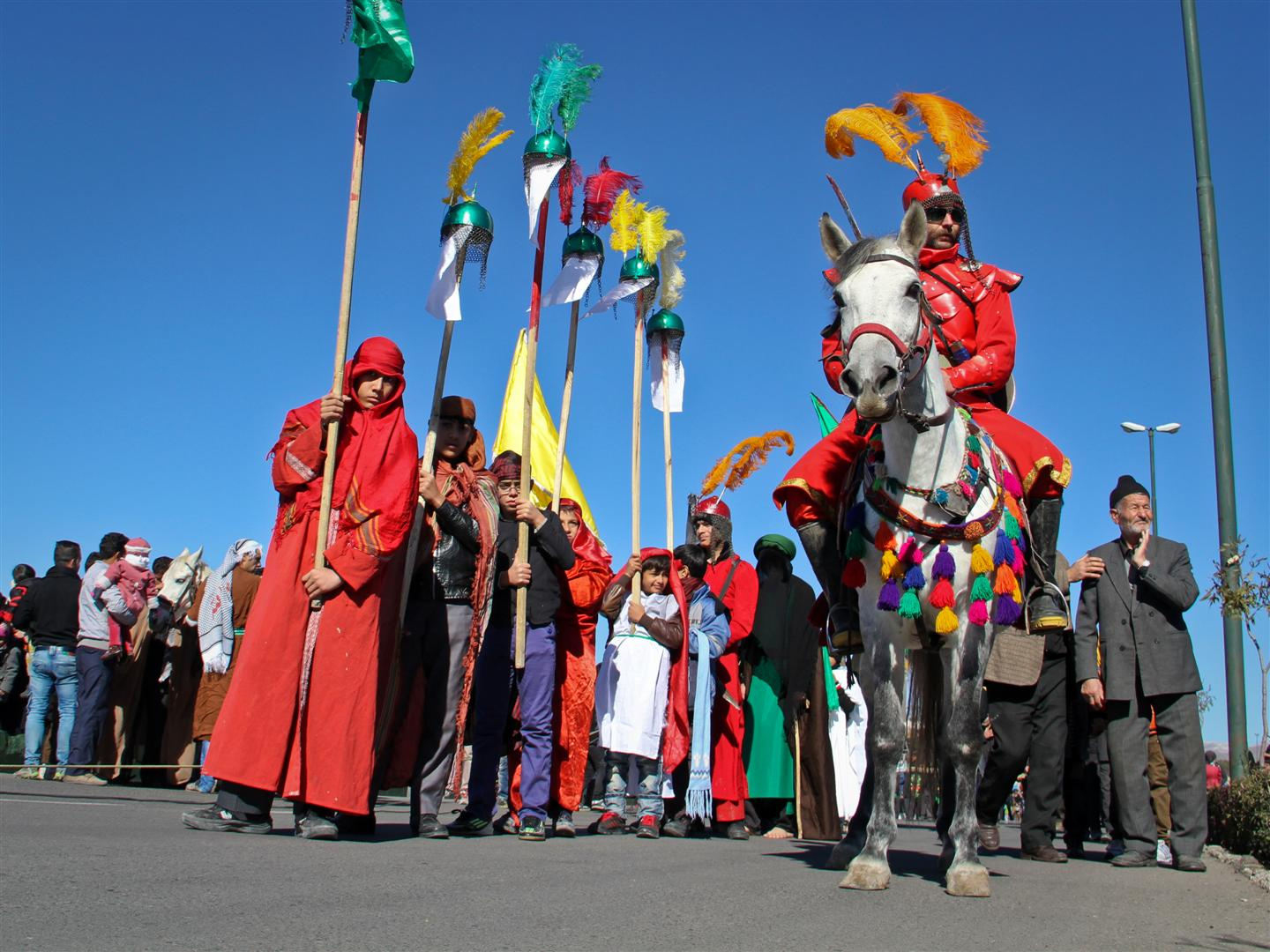
- Originating culture: Iran

The ritual dramatic art of Ta'zīye
- UNESCO Intangible Cultural Heritage
- Country: Iran
- Reference: 00377
- Region: Asia and the Pacific

Inscription history
- Inscription: 2010 (5th session)
- List: Representative

Ta'ziyeh, also spelled as ta'zieh (Note: Also spelled ta'ziye, ta'ziya, ta'ziyah, ta'zia and other variants.) (Iranian Persian: تعزیه, romanized: taʿziye [tæʔziˈje], from Arabic تعزية taʿziya, 'condolence'), is a dramatic art form of Iran, performed by Shia Muslims, and historically also called shabih-khani (Iranian Persian: شبیه‌خوانی, romanized: šabih-xâni [ʃæbiːɦxɒːˈniː]), though this term is less commonly used today.

Performances of ta'ziyeh have often been described as "Iranian passion plays". They reenact the events of the Battle of Karbala (680 CE), centering on the tragic death of Husayn ibn Ali, a grandson of the Islamic prophet Muhammad, along with his family members and companions on the plains of Karbala (present-day Iraq). The event, which resulted from a political struggle over leadership of the Muslim community after Muhammad's death, became a powerful symbol of sacrifice, resistance, and justice in Shia Islam.

Sir Lewis Pelly began the preface of his book about ta'ziyeh maintaining that

If the success of a drama is to be measured by the effects which it produces upon the people for whom it is composed, or upon the audiences before whom it is represented, no play has ever surpassed the tragedy known in the Mussulman world as that of Hasan and Husain.

Years later Peter J. Chelkowski, professor of Iranian and Islamic studies at New York University, chose the same words for the beginning of his book Taʻziyeh: Ritual and Drama in Iran.

Today, we know of 250 ta'ziyeh pieces. They were collected by Enrico Cerulli, Italian ambassador to Iran, and added to a collection that can be found in the Vatican Library. Ta'ziyeh plays have been translated from Persian into French by Aleksander Chodźko, the Polish orientalist, into Ukrainian by Ahatanhel Krymsky, Ukrainian orientalist, and into German by Davud Monshizadeh, Iranian Orientalist. Various other scripts can be found scattered throughout Iran.

== Etymology and terminology ==
The Iranian Persian word تعزیه (taʿziye) derives from Arabic تعزية (taʿziya, 'condolence'), which is the verbal noun of the Form II verb عزى (ʿazza 'to console'). A performer or reciter who takes part in a ta'ziyeh play is called a ta'ziyeh-khan (Iranian Persian: تعزیه‌خوان, romanized: taʿziye-xân [tæʔzijeˈxɒːn], lit. 'ta'ziyeh-reciter'). The act or practice of performing a ta'ziyeh play is called ta'ziyeh-khani (Iranian Persian: تعزیه‌خوانی, romanized: taʿziye-xâni [tæʔzijexɒːˈniː], lit. 'ta'ziyeh-recitation').

The word shabih-khani (Iranian Persian: شبیه‌خوانی, romanized: šabih-xâni, from Arabic شبيه šabīh 'resembling, similar') is an alternative term for ta'ziyeh, although it is now less commonly used; it emphasizes the act of impersonating figures from the tragedy of Karbala.

== Religious background ==
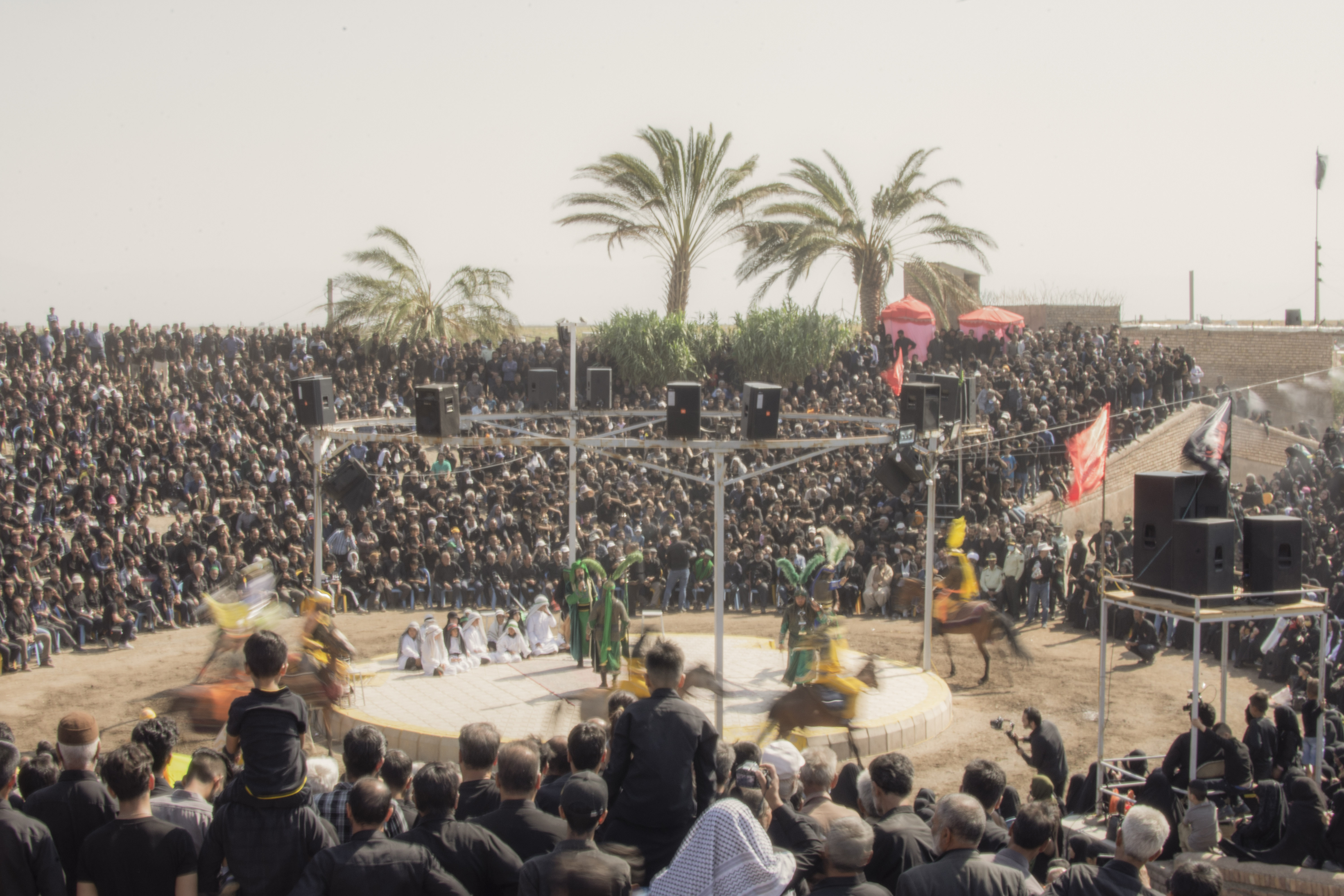
Ta'ziyeh being performed outdoors in a village of Razavi Khorasan

There are two branches of Islam; the Sunni and the Shi'i. The Sunnis make up about 85–90% of Muslims, but the ta'ziyeh tradition is performed by Shia Muslims during the first month of the Muslim calendar, Muharram, one of the four sacred months of the Islam calendar. The ta'ziyeh is performed each year on the 10th day of Muharram, a historically significant day for the Shia Muslims because that was the day of Husayn's slaughter. Each year the same story is told, so the spectators know the story very well and know what to expect. However, this does not negatively affect audience levels.

A strong belief in the Muslim community was that nothing created by regular people could be better than the way Allah created it, so all other creation was deemed disrespectful. Because of this, there are not many accounts—visually or otherwise—of this religious tradition. During the tradition it was very important that all spectators knew the actors were not disrespecting Allah, so most often, the actors had their scripts on stage with them so it was clear that they were not trying to depict another person that Allah did not create.

== History ==
=== Pre-Islamic roots ===
Ta'ziyeh is often discussed in relation to earlier Iranian narrative and performative traditions. According to Anthony Shay, sacred Iranian performative practices such as rowzeh-khani and ta'ziyeh "have direct roots to the related and corresponding non-sacred practices of shah-nameh-khani, naqqali, and siyah-bazi theatre." Some scholars have noted parallels between ta'ziyeh and pre-Islamic mourning narratives, particularly the story of Siavash in the Shahnameh, whose tragic death and subsequent mourning rituals are sometimes cited as an early example of ritual lamentation in Iranian culture.

Ta'ziyeh as a kind of passion play is a kind of comprehensive indigenous form considered as being the national form of Iranian theatre which have pervasive influence in the Iranian works of drama and play. It originates from some famous mythologies and rites such as Mithraism, Sug-e Siavush (Mourning for Siavush) and Yadegar-e Zariran or Memorial of Zarir. Mourning for Siavosh as reflected in literature is a manifestation of all the prominent characteristics of Islamic shabih-khani. Quoting Seyed Hossein Fadaie,

Some believe that Iman Hossein's tragedy as depicted in Taziah is the next recreation of the legend of Siavosh

=== Islamic-era development ===
==== Beginnings ====
There is uncertainty about when ta'ziyeh appeared in its Islamic form. According to Ghanoonparvar and Green,

Although the roots of ta'ziyeh date back many centuries, even to pre-Islamic Iran, in its Islamic form, it began to thrive during the Safavid period, in the sixteenth century, and flourished later, particularly in the nineteenth century, during the Qajar dynasty, whose kings patronized this dramatic art form."

According to Chelkowski,

The ta‘zia passion play was born in the middle of the 18th century (although many scholars believe it occurred as early as in the end of the 17th century; see Beyżāʾi) when the costumed marchers of the dasta began to recite the stories of the rowża-ḵᵛāni.

Monchi-Zadeh considered ta'ziyeh to be a modern form of theater likely originating around the first decade of the 19th century, based on his observation that neither native Persian literature, nor Western travelers noted any theatrical productions in Muharram prior to the 19th century.

==== Peak under the Qajars ====
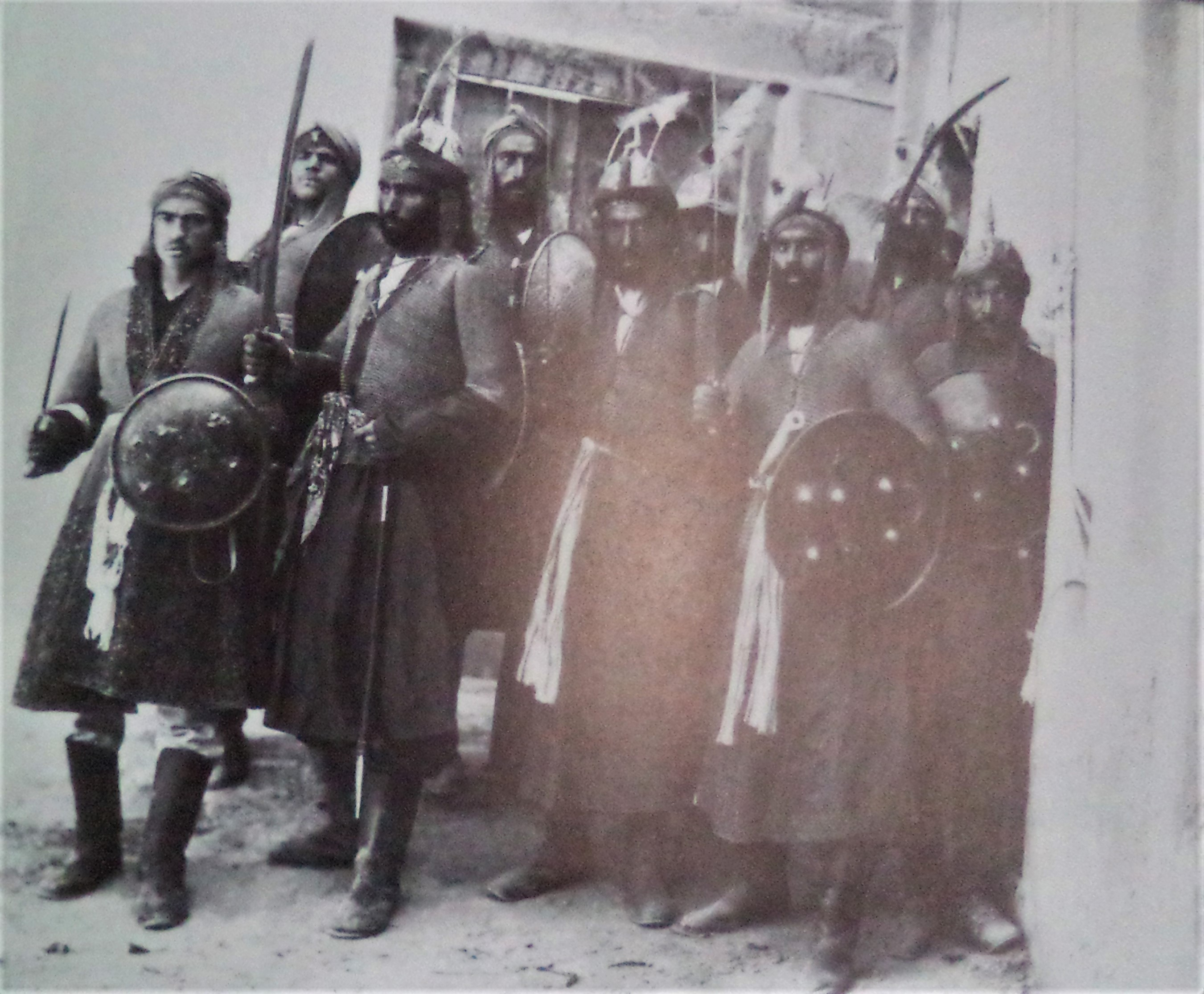
Photograph of ta'ziyeh actors in Isfahan, 1880

The development of ta'ziyeh reached its peak during the Qajar period thanks, in particular, to the great interest shown by the Qajar rulers, especially Naser al-Din Shah Qajar (r. 1848–1896), who would build the Takyeh Dowlat.

A most important development during this period is that "due to popular demand," performances of ta'ziyeh were no longer restricted to the month of Muharram and the following month of Safar, but extended to other times throughout the year. In the beginning, there were only certain dates in the Shiite calendar when ta'ziyeh could be performed. For example, the ta'ziyeh of the martyrdom of Ali, the first Shiite Imam and the fourth caliph, was performed on the 21st of Ramadan, the day Ali died from a sword wound. Popular appreciation of this dramatic form encouraged the growth of the ta'ziyeh repertory. Other stories from the Islamic tradition as well as biblical stories and Iranian national legends were incorporated. Since staging a performance involved a great deal of effort, a ta'ziyeh group would usually perform in the same place for several days, mixing the Muharram repertory with what we can call the fringe ta'ziyeh plays. Among these plays, we finally come across comedies, or more accurately, satires, concerning various perceived enemies of the Shiites. In particular, these satires concentrated on Umar, Uthman, and Abu Bakr, the three caliphs who, according to popular Shiite belief, were instrumental in preventing Ali from becoming the first caliph/Imam after the death of Muhammad.

=== Decline ===
The decline of ta'ziyeh began in response to the interference and opposition of several elements and forces. To begin with, during the last years of the Qajar rule, although ta'ziyeh never lost its popularity, the support of the court and the well-to-do started to wane, causing the ta'ziyeh performers to seek sponsorship from the lower strata of society.

After Nasser al-Din Shah, the glory and the importance of ta'ziyeh gradually diminished but its popularity was conserved. The professional troupes which were newly formed toured the cities all year round and performed.

The rural population did not enjoy the sophistication (or perhaps the decadence) of the more advanced urban society. They were definitely more interested in the traditional ta'ziyeh and had no interest in comical developments in their yearly mourning ritual.

The ritual was eventually banned by the authorities in Iran because the ritual was being exploited for political advances. Ta'ziyeh is not performed regularly in Iran and has not been seen at all in certain provinces of the region since 1920. France was the first non-Muslim country that ta'ziyeh was performed in 1991. Since then, the tradition has been seen in non-Iranian cities like Avignon and Paris in France, Parma and Rome in Italy, and New York City.

== Staging ==
=== Performance spaces ===
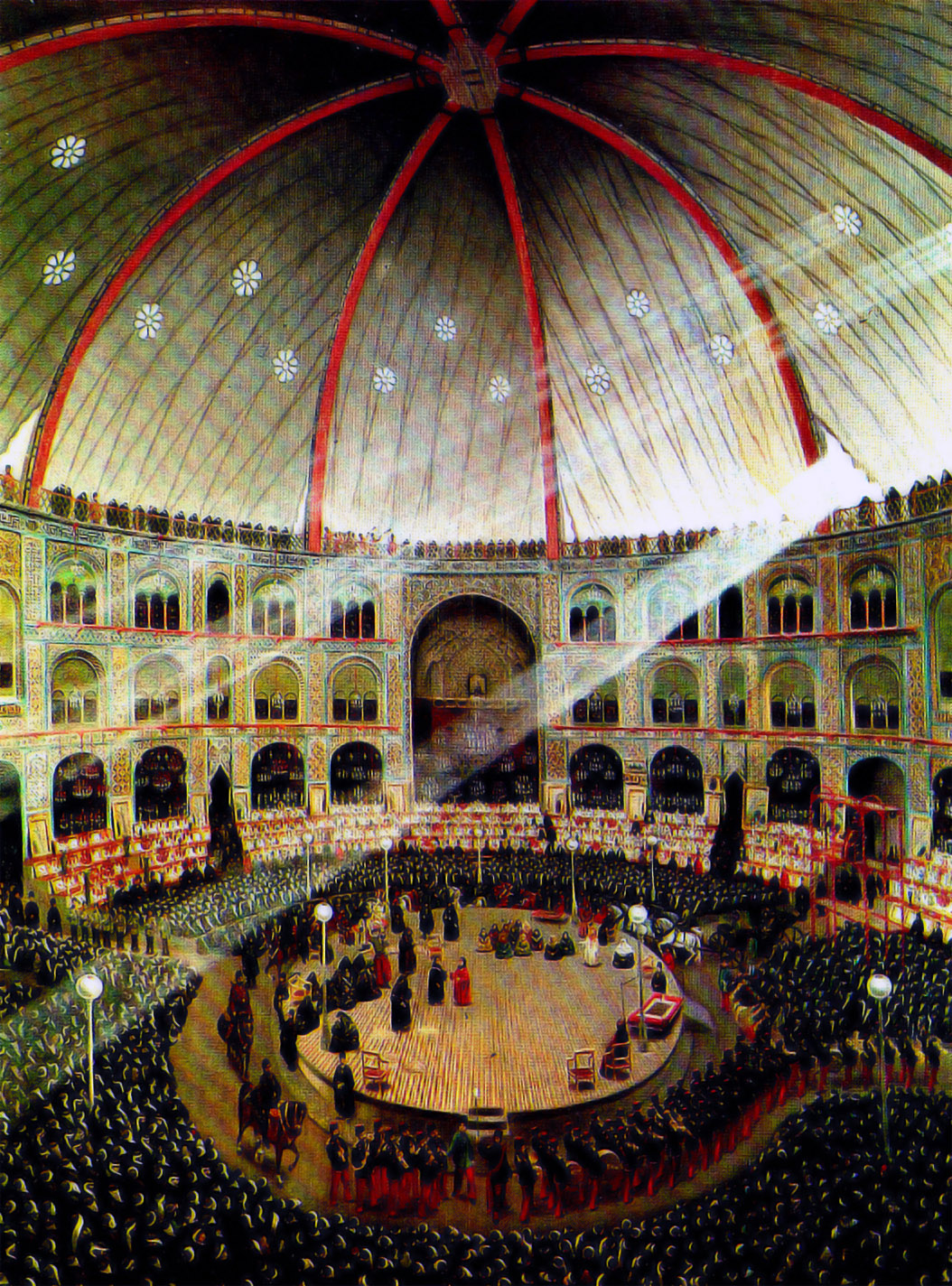
The Takyeh Dowlat which formerly stood in Tehran

Originally, ta'ziyeh plays, like Western passion plays, were performed in a public arena, allowing large audiences to convene. They later moved to smaller spaces like courtyards and spaces within the homes of private citizens, but eventually ended up being performed in temporarily constructed performance spaces called takyehs or husayniyyas, the most famous takyeh being the Takyeh Dowlat built by Naser al-Din Shah Qajar and formerly situated in Tehran. Takyehs (with the exception of the Takyeh Dowlat) were almost always constructed for temporary use and then demolished at the end of Muharram. The Takyeh Dowlat was a permanent space built in 1868, but was torn down 79 years later in 1947 due to lack of use and replaced by a bank. Its capacity was 4,000. They varied in size fitting anywhere between a dozen to thousands of spectators. Takyehs were somewhat open-air, but almost always had awnings of sorts atop the building to shield the spectators and actors from sun and rain. All performers in a ta'ziyeh ceremony never leave the stage. The stage is elevated between one and two feet from the ground and split into four areas: one for the protagonists, antagonists, smaller subplots, and props.

Unlike most other theater traditions, especially Western theater traditions, the ta'ziyeh stage and its use of props were minimalist and stark. All takyehs are designed so that the ta'ziyeh performance happens in-the-round to create a more intense experience between the actors and the audience. This enabled spectators to feel like they were part of the action on stage and sometimes encouraged them to become physically active members of the performance; it was also not unusual for combat scenes to occur behind the audience.

=== Costumes and character representation ===
Costumes for a ta'ziyeh ritual are what is considered representational in terms of theater. They are not meant to present reality. The main goal of the costume design was not to be historically accurate, but to help the audience recognize which type of character they were looking at. Villains were the Sunni opponents of Imam Husayn. They are always dressed in red. The protagonists, family members of Husayn, were dressed in green if they were male characters. Anyone about to die was in white. Women were always portrayed by men in all black. One way to distinguish character besides the color of their costume is how they deliver their lines. The protagonists or family of Imam Husayn sing or chant their lines and the villains will declaim their lines. If a person is traveling in a circle on or around the stage, that meant they were going a long distance (usually represented the distance between Mecca and Karbala). Traveling in a straight line represented a shorter distance traveled.

=== Animals in performances ===
Animals frequently played a role in ta'ziyeh performances. Performers often rode horses, and men would train from a young age to participate in equestrian roles, considered an honor in Persian culture. Other animals, such as camels, sheep, or symbolic representations of lions (usually a man wearing a mask), were also sometimes included.

== Dramatic techniques ==
=== Goriz or theatrical digressions and secular themes ===
The theatrical device of goriz (Persian: گریز, lit. 'flight, escape', a deverbal noun derived from the present stem of گریختن gorikhtan 'to flee') allowed ta'ziyeh playwrights to reference the events of Karbala while incorporating stories or events outside the central narrative, functioning similarly to a flashback or flash-forward in Western theater. (Note: In ta'ziyeh this word, combined with the auxiliary verb zadan, acquired a very specific meaning: 'to refer to the events of Karbala'. In English goriz zadan could be translated as 'flashback' or 'flash-forward', as the case may be.) Goriz provides a legitimate pretext for secular or non-Shiite content in ta'ziyeh. Playwrights employed this technique as a digression: in the secular ta'ziyeh there is usually a glance at one of the events of Karbala, often toward the end of the play, but this varies depending on the action of the play. Through goriz, all human conditions are directly or indirectly related to the suffering and tragic death of the "Martyrs of Karbala," regardless of whether the story takes place before or after the Karbala massacre. The Cerulli collection housed in the Vatican Library contains some 1,05,05 ta'ziyeh manuscripts collected by the Italian Ambassador, Enrico Cerulli, between the years 195o and 1955. These five mnuscripts are (I) The Majles-e Amir Teymour, (2) The Dervish of the Desert, (3) Mansar Halldj, Shams-e Tabriz and Mulla of Ram, (4) The Majles-e Shahanshah-e Iran, Naser al-Din Shah, and (5) Majles of Tax Collection by Muinolbu. These manuscripts shed a light on the process by which ta'ziyeh gradually branched off into a would-be secular theatre.

=== Music and vocal performance ===
Because performances rely heavily on music, stylized acting, and sung dialogue, some scholars have compared ta'ziyeh to opera.

Quoting Soussie Rastegar and Anna Vanzan,

Ta'ziyeh has both instrumental music, consisting of drums and trumpets, and vocal music: the sympathetic characters, allied with Imam Hussein, chant their lines using poetic texts in classical Persian musical modes.

=== Symbolism in movements ===
Concerning movements of the performers, "conventions are equally simple and straightforward For example, movement in an arc or circle depicts a long journey; movement in a straight line, actual distance."

== Women in ta'ziyeh ==
Women were not considered active members of the ta'ziyeh performance ritual. Almost all women in these rituals were played by young males, however on some occasions little girls under the age of nine were able to fulfill small roles. Women were traditionally played by males who would wear all black and veil their faces. During the festival period, the takyehs were lavishly decorated by the women of the community that the performance took place, with the prized personal possessions of the local community. Refreshments were prepared by women and served to the spectators by the children of well-off families. Society women were invited to watch the performance from the boxes above the general viewing area. Generally the audience consisted of the more well-off families as they regarded ta'ziyeh as entertainment, while the lower-class community members thought of it as an important religious ritual. The ta'ziyeh gained popularity during the 19th century and women painted scenes from ta'ziyeh performances on the stage on canvases and recorded history. This was a huge step in the history of islamic art.

== Influence and modern adaptations ==
Iranian cinema and Iranian symphonic music have been influenced by the long tradition of ta'ziyeh in Iran. Abbas Kiarostami, the noted film maker, held a series of three live ta'ziyeh plays in Rome in 2002. Kiarostami also made a documentary movie titled, "A Look to Ta'ziyeh" in which he explores the relationship of the audience to this theatrical form. Film director, Nasser Taghvaee also made a documentary on titled, "Tamrin e Akhar" (2005). In 2001, Parviz Jahed directed the documentary film Ta'ziyeh; Another Narration, exploring the mythological, religious, and ritual elements of ta'ziyeh and its connection to Soug-e Siavash (Siavash's mourning) in the Shahnameh. The film features insights from prominent researchers and Ta'ziyeh experts such as Bahram Beyzai, Peter J. Chelkowski, Jaber Anasori, Laleh Taghian, and Abdul-Ali Khalili, a ta'ziyeh director and performer. They discuss various aspects of this sacred ritual drama, including its dramatic structure and performance techniques. The analysis focuses on the Imam-Hossain and his brother Hazrat-e Abbas Ta'ziyeh, performed and filmed in rural northern Iran, particularly in Shavy-Laasht village in the Mazandaran province. The film was selected for the 44th Festival dei Popoli in Florence, Italy and the First Iranian Festival in Berkeley, CA, both in late 2003, and the third annual Tiburon International Film Festival in Tiburon, CA in early 2004.

Mohammad B. Ghaffari introduced renowned theatre directors Peter Brook and Jerzy Grotowski to ta'ziyeh during the Shiraz Arts Festival in Shiraz, Iran prior to the Iranian Revolution of 1978-79, where he produced and directed several dramas from the ta'ziyeh cycle. He subsequently produced ta'ziyeh performances at the Festival d'Avignon in France in 1992, and most notably at the Lincoln Center Festival in New York City in 2002 featuring performers from traditional taziyeh troupes in Iran, to widespread critical praise. This production and its preparation was presented in a documentary film, The Troupe, directed by Rabeah Ghaffari.

== Gallery ==
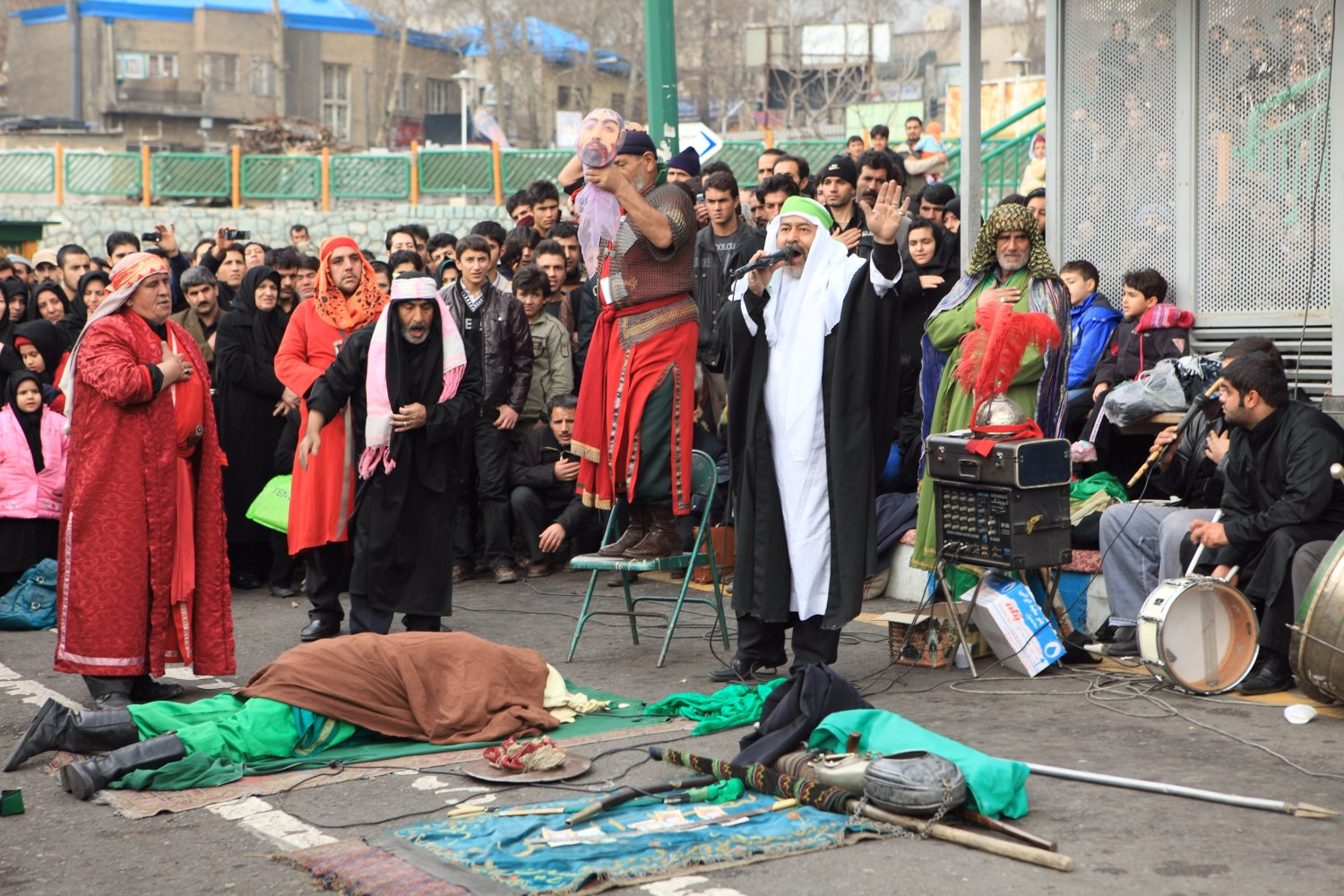
Ta'zieh in Tajrish, Tehran

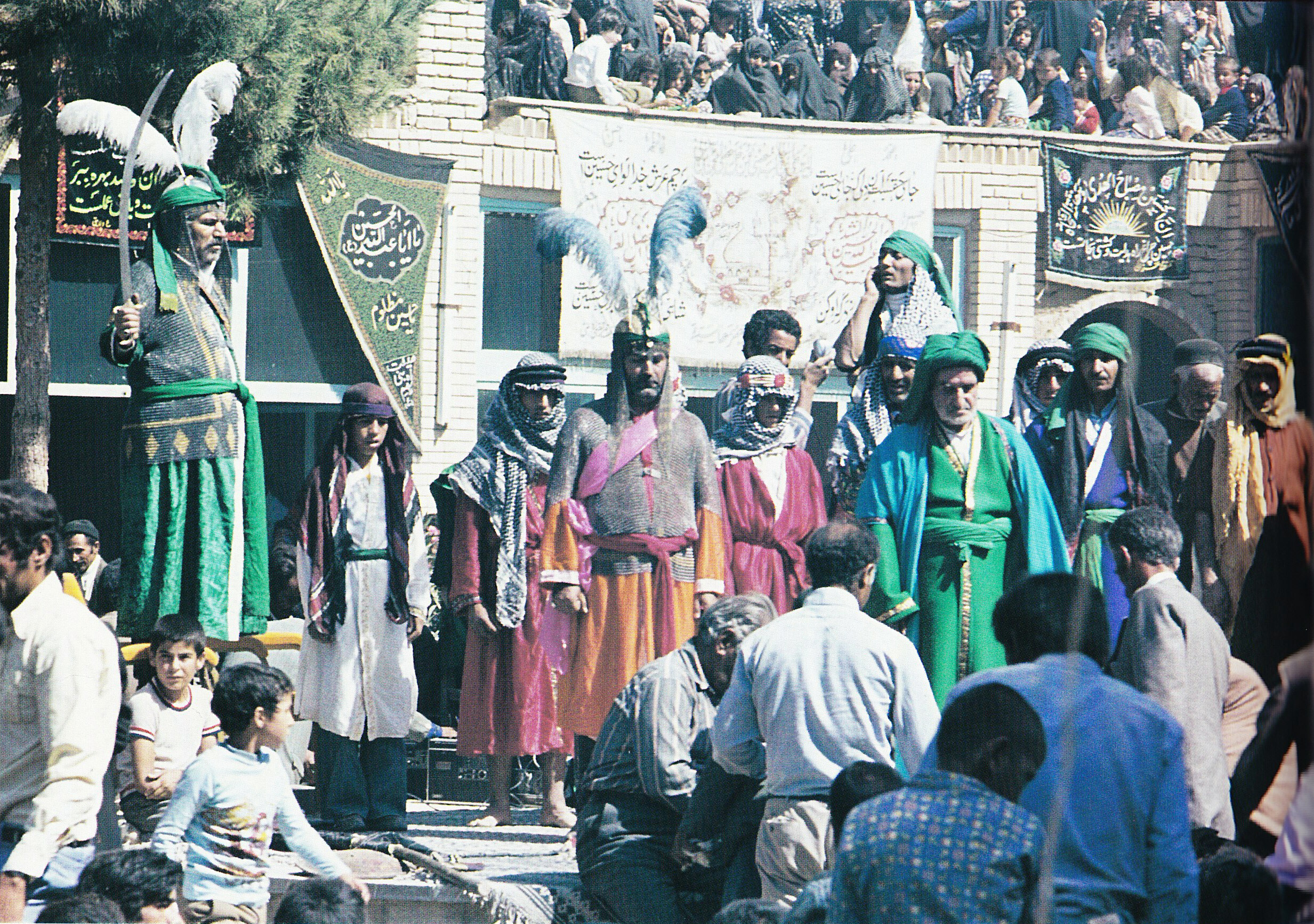
Ta'ziye in Shiraz Arts Festival,1977

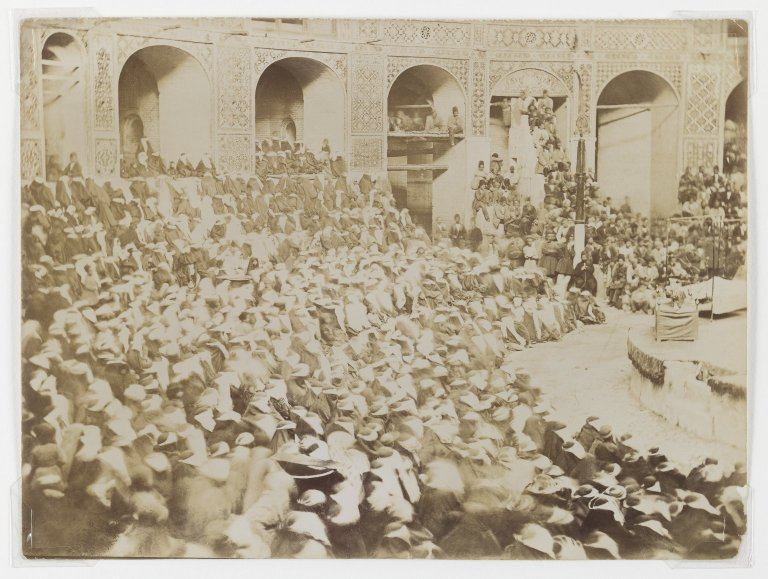
Women Attending a Ta'zieh 1800s

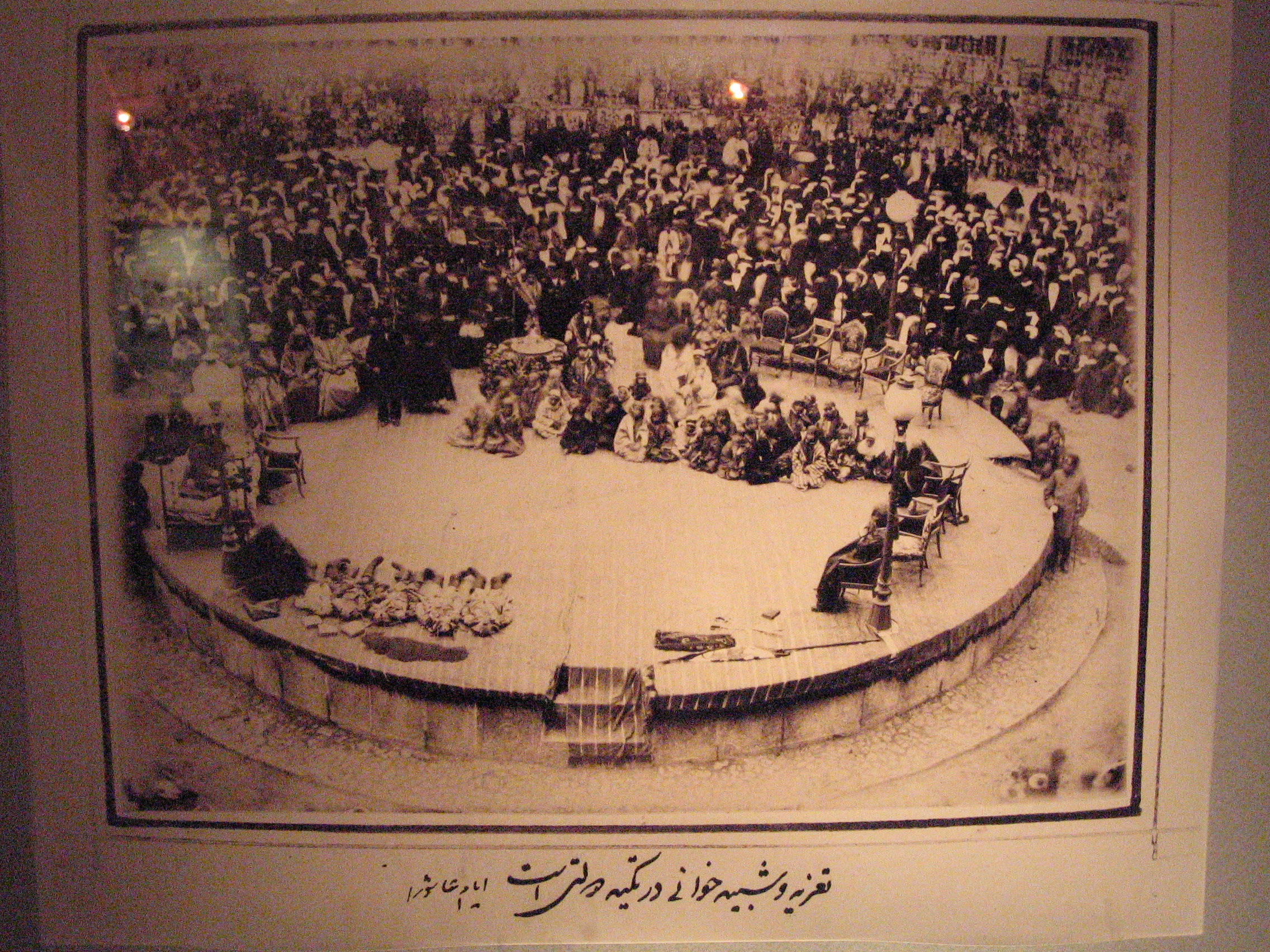
Ta'ziyeh in the Takyeh Dowlat

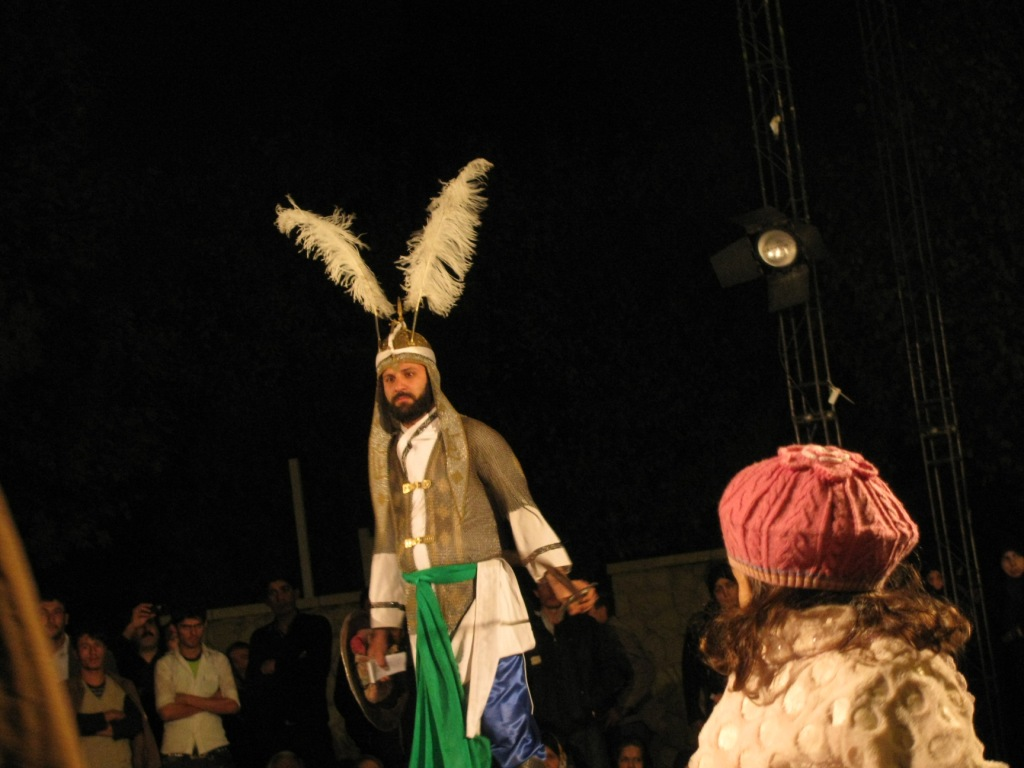
Ta'zieh in Tehran

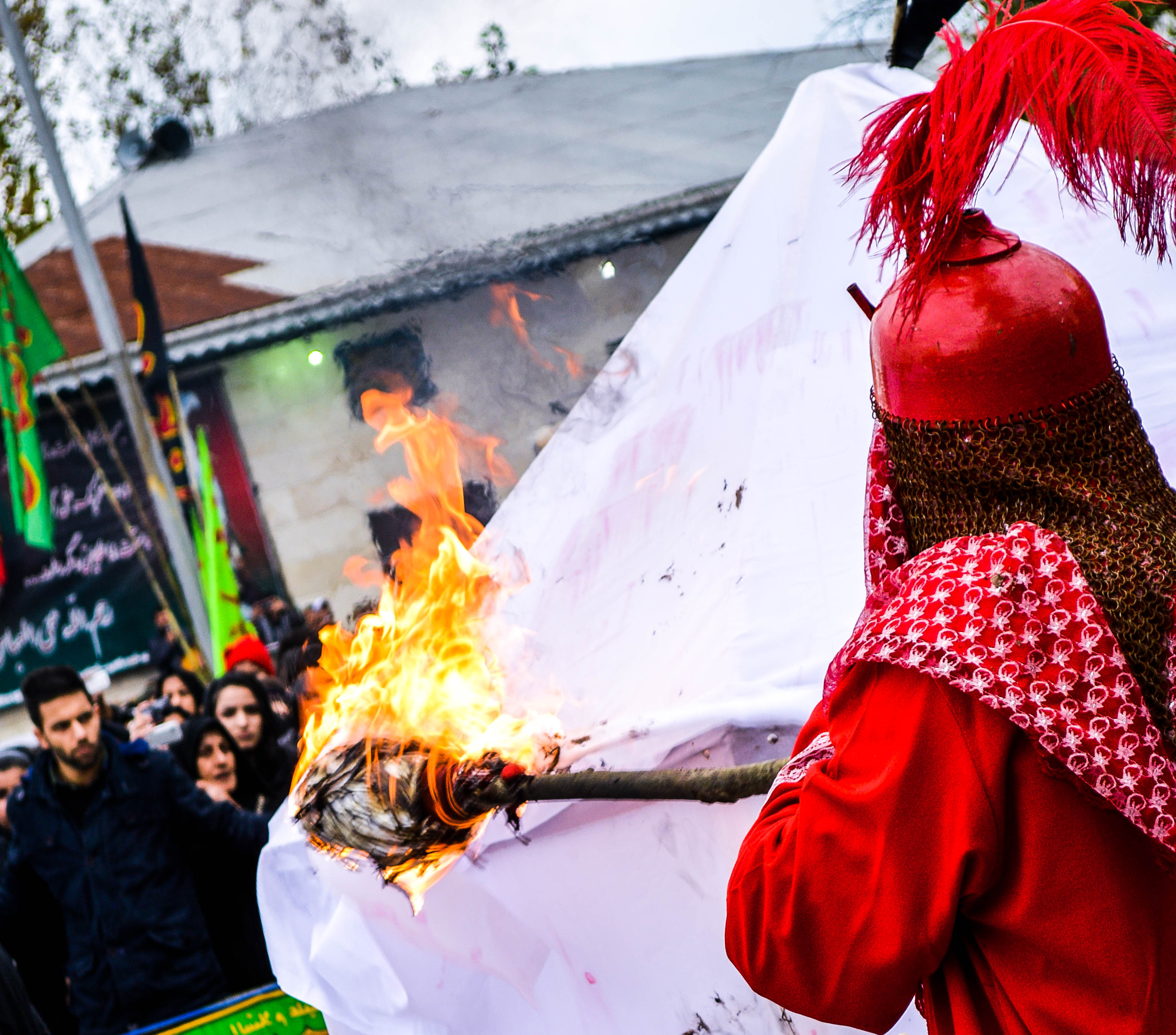
A man acting as Umar ibn Sa'd whose army set fire to Imam Husayn's family tents, Iran

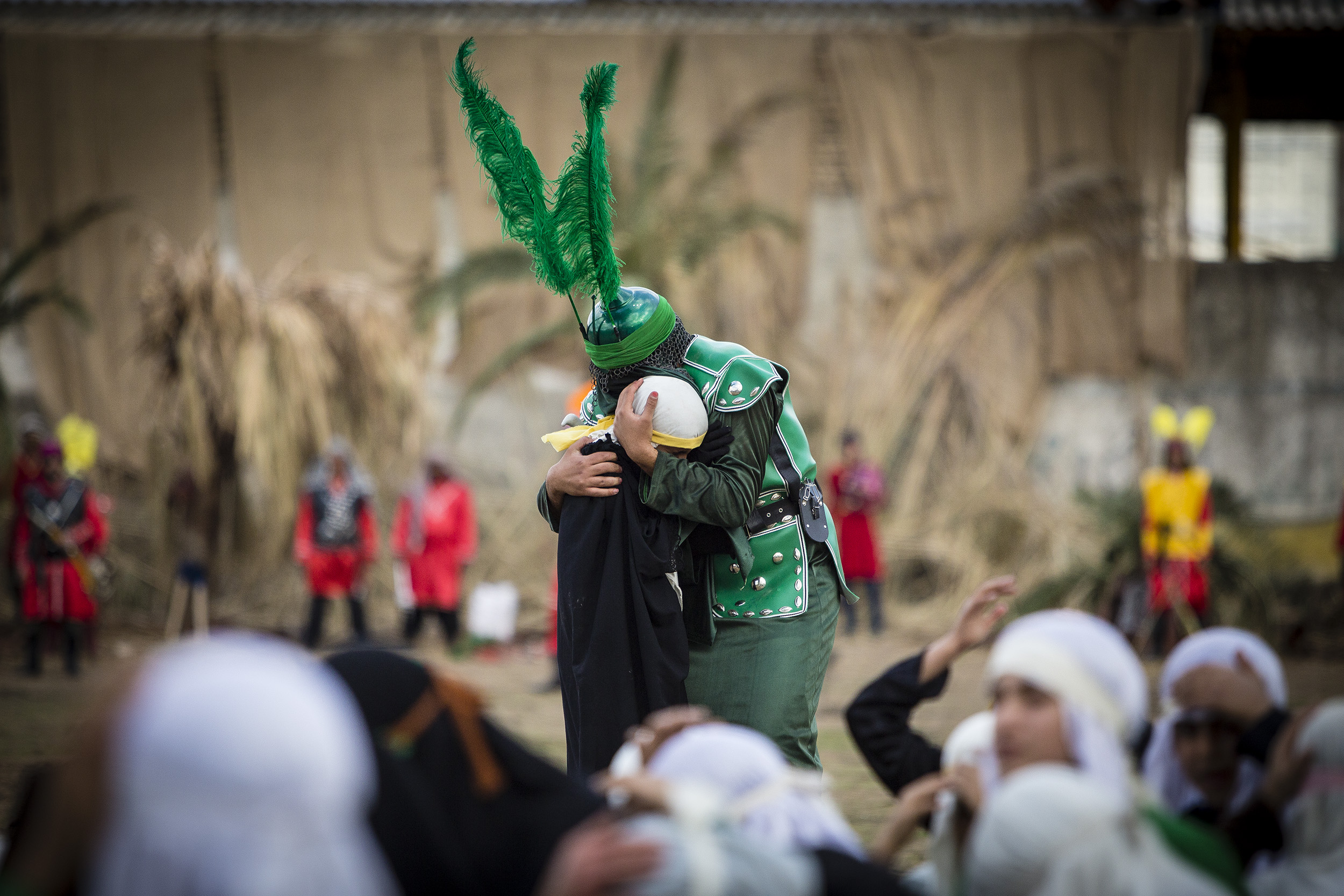
Ta'zieh in Iran, mourning of Muharram

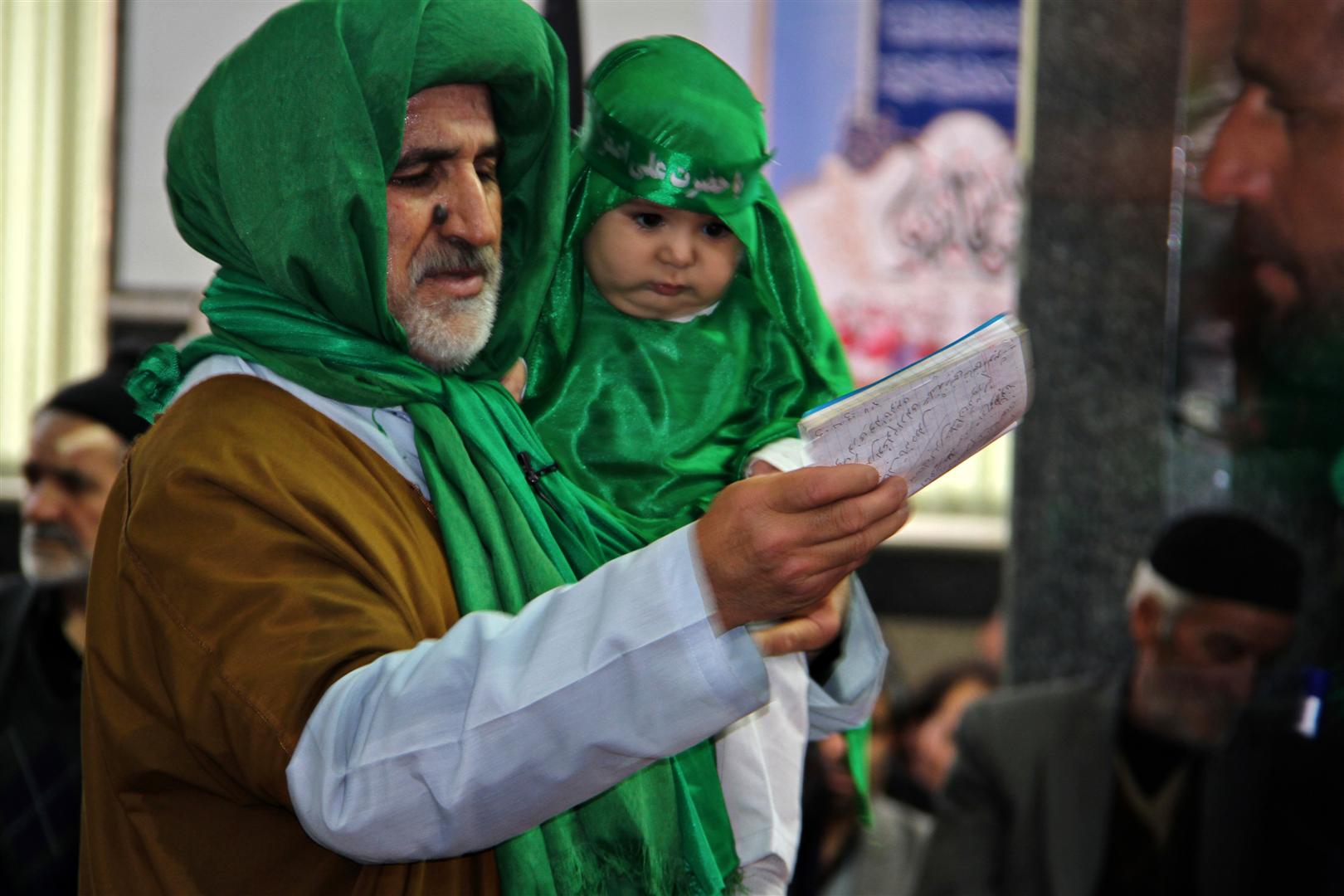
All actors use scripts during performance

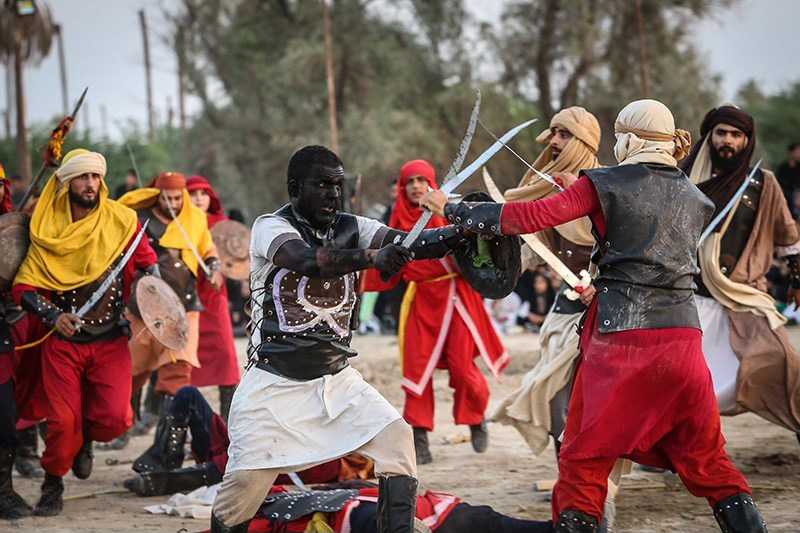
Ta'zieh (2017) in Iran

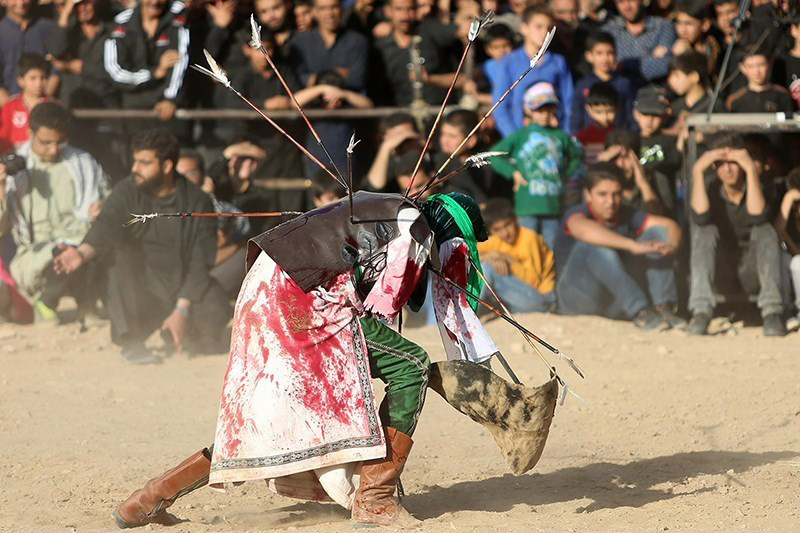
Ta'zieh (2003) in Iran

== See also ==
- Islam in Iran
- Takyeh
- Muharram

== Sources ==
- Aghaie, Kamran Scot (2005). "The Origins of the Sunnite-Shiʿite Divide and the Emergence of the Taʿziyeh Tradition". TDR. 49 (4). JSTOR 4488679.
- Alizadeh, Farideh; Hashim, Mohd Nasir (2015). Ta'ziyeh-Influenced Theatre. CreateSpace Independent Publishing Platform. ISBN 978-1-5197-3179-1.
- Alizadeh, Farideh; Hashim, Mohd Nasir (2016). "When the attraction of Ta'ziyeh is diminished, the community should inevitably find a suitable replacement for it". Cogent Arts & Humanities. 3 (1). doi:10.1080/23311983.2016.1190482.
- Anvar, Iraj (2005). "Peripheral Taʿziyeh: The Transformation of Taʿziyeh from Muharram Mourning Ritual to Secular and Comical Theatre". TDR. 49 (4): 61–67. JSTOR 4488681.
- Beeman, William O. (2003). "The Ta'ziyeh of Hor. The Ta'ziyeh of the Children of Moslem. The Ta'ziyeh of Imam Hussein". Theatre Journal. 55 (2): 359–362. doi:10.1353/tj.2003.0053.
- Caron, Nelly (1975). "The Ta'zieh, the Secret Theatre of Iran". The World of Music. 17 (4): 3–10. JSTOR 43620726.
- Chelkowski, Peter J. (1979). Taʻziyeh: Ritual and Drama in Iran. New York University Press. ISBN 0-8147-1375-0.
- Chelkowski, Peter J. (1989). "Narrative Painting and Painting Recitation in Qajar Iran". Muqarnas. 6: 98–111. doi:10.1163/22118993-90000238. JSTOR 1602284.
- Chelkowski, Peter J.; Dabashi, Hamid (1999). Staging a Revolution: The Art of Persuasion in the Islamic Republic of Iran. New York University Press.
- Chelkowski, Peter J. (2004). "ḤOSAYN B. ʿALI iii. THE PASSION OF ḤOSAYN". Encyclopædia Iranica.
- Chelkowski, Peter J. (2005). "Time Out of Memory: Taʿziyeh, the Total Drama". TDR. 49 (4): 15–27. doi:10.1162/105420405774763050. ISSN 1054-2043. JSTOR 4488675. S2CID 57568526.
- Chelkowski, Peter J. (2009). "TAʿZIA". Encyclopædia Iranica.
- Chelkowski, Peter J. (2010). "Identification and Analysis of the Scenic Space in Traditional Iranian Theatre". Eternal Performance: Ta'ziyeh and Other Shiite Rituals. India: Seagull. pp. 92–105. ISBN 978-1-9064-9-751-4.
- Emami, Iraj (1987). The Evolution of Tradition Theatre and The Development of Modern Theatre in Iran. Scotland: University of Edinburgh. p. 48.
- Ghanoonparvar, M. R.; Green, John (1989). Iranian Drama: An Anthology.
- Jenkins, Ron (2002-07-07). "THEATER; An Iranian Musical Spectacle That Draws Audiences In". The New York Times. ISSN 0362-4331.
- Marshall, Lee (2003-07-14). "Feature: Abbas Kiarostami's theatre debut". The Guardian.
- Monchi-Zadeh, Davoud (1967). Taʿziya: Das persische Passionsspiel [Taʿziya: The Persian passion play]. Skrifter utgivna av Kungl. humanistiska vetenskapssamfundet i Uppsala (in German). Vol. 44: 4. Stockholm: Almqvist & Wiksell. pp. 14–16.
- Nahidi, Katrin (2023). The Cultural Politics of Art in Iran.
- O’Neil, Catherine; Scoggin, Mary; Tuite, Kevin, eds. (2005). Language, Culture and the Individual: A Tribute to Paul Friedrich.
- Pelly, Lewis (1879). The Miracle Play of Hasan and Husain. W. H. Allen and Co. ISBN 978-1-0152-8641-2.
- Rastegar, Soussie; Vanzan, Anna, eds. (2007). Muraqqa'e Sharqi: Studies in Honor of Peter Chelkowski.
- Shay, Anthony (1999). Choreophobia: Solo Improvised Dance in the Iranian World.
- Sheibani, Khatereh (2011). The Poetics of Iranian Cinema.
- Zarilli, Phillip B.; McConachie, Bruce; Williams, Gary Jay; Sorgenfrei, Carol Fisher (2006). Theatre Histories: An Introduction. USA: Routledge. ISBN 978-0-415-22727-8.
