= Chełkowski =

Chełkowski is a Polish surname. Notable people with the surname include:

- August Chełkowski (1927–1999), Polish physicist and politician
- Peter J. Chelkowski (1933–2024), Polish-American scholar of Iranian and Islamic studies
