= Takyeh =

Place in Iran where Husayn bin Ali is mourned by Shia

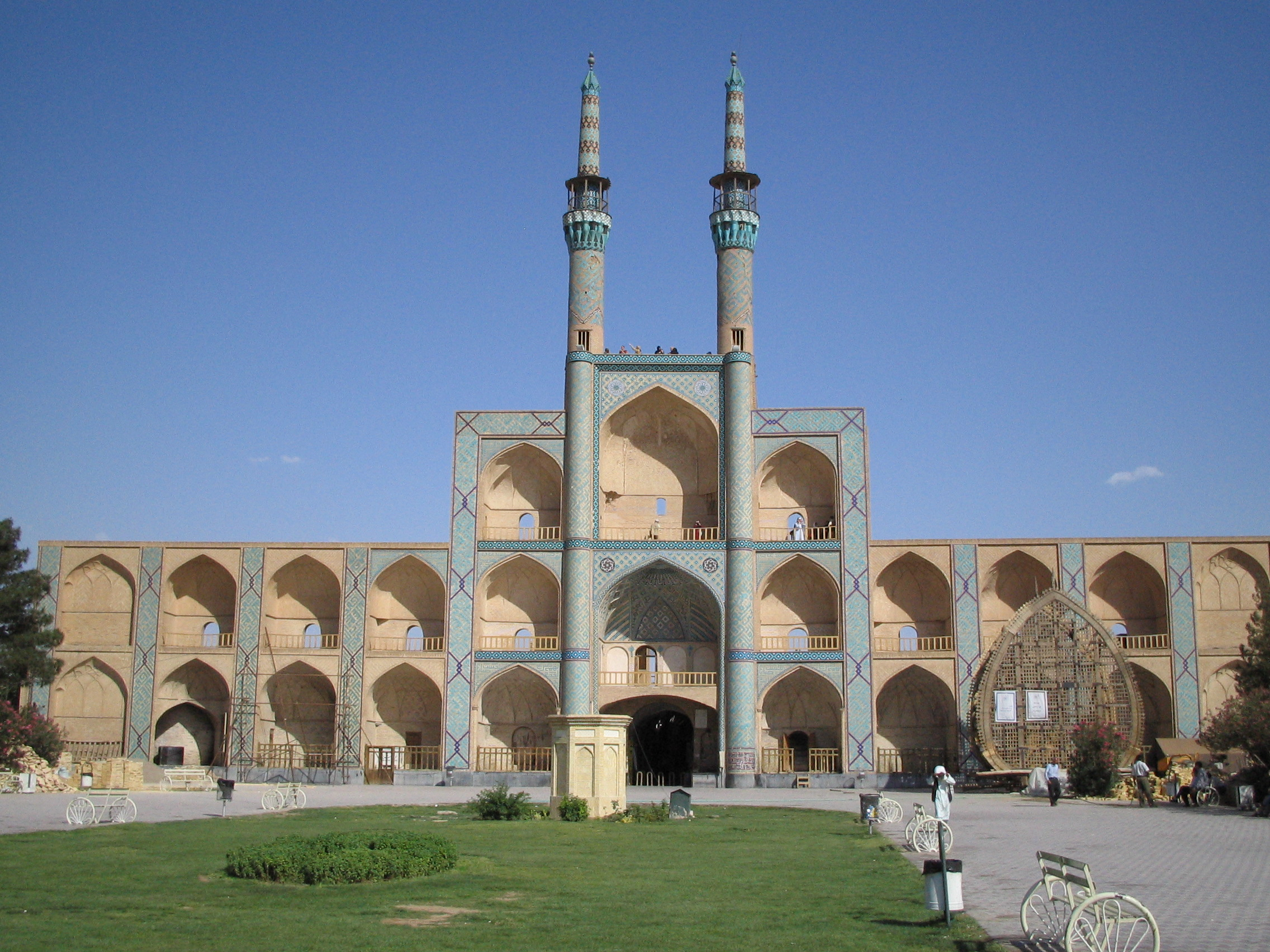
The medieval Takyeh Mir Chakhmaq in Yazd, Iran

In Iran, the word takyeh (Iranian Persian: تکیه, romanized: takye) is mostly used as a synonym of husayniyya (or hoseyniyeh in Iranian Persian; building where Shia Muslims gather to mourn the death of Husayn ibn Ali in the month of Muharram), although some takyehs also include a zaynabiyya (or zeynabiyeh, in honor of Husayn's sister Zaynab bint Ali) or an abbasiyya (or abbasiyeh, in honor of Husayn's paternal half-brother Abbas ibn Ali), like the Takyeh Moaven-ol-Molk. Many takyehs are found in Iran, where there are takyehs in almost every city.

== History ==
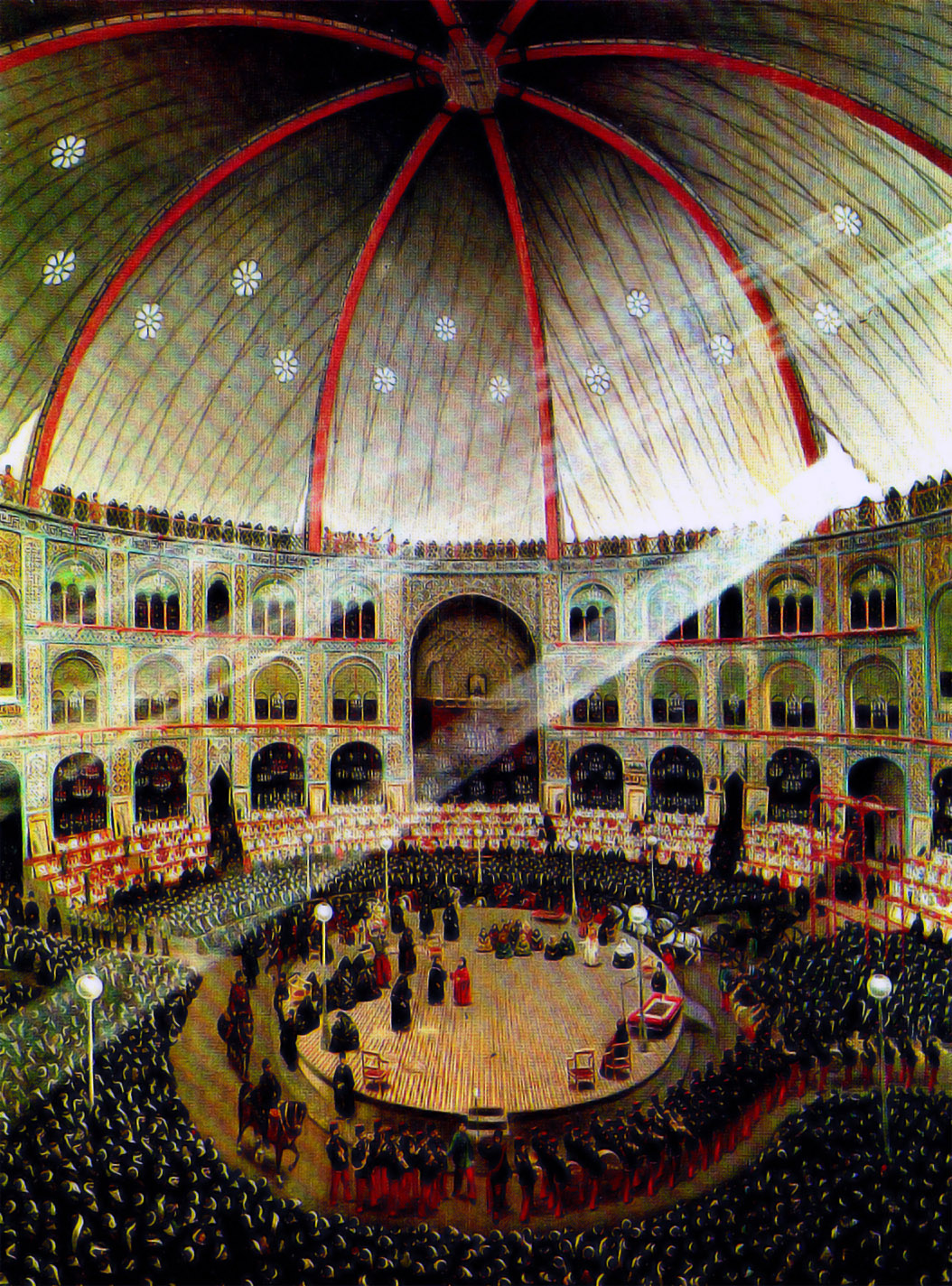
The former Takyeh Dowlat ('State Takyeh') in Tehran

In Classical Persian, a takya in the religious sense was originally a place for Sufi gatherings; Sufis were called تکیه‌نشین takya-nishīn or تکیه‌دار takya-dār. Following the Safavid conversion of Iran to Shia Islam, existing takyas became used as husayniyyas, and the majority of takyehs built in Iran since Iran's conversion have been built to be used as husayniyyas, like the Takyeh Dowlat built by Naser al-Din Shah Qajar. Tehran alone is said to have had up to 50 takyehs under the Qajar dynasty.

== Architecture ==
Takyehs throughout Iran are usually designed with observable elements of Persian architecture.

== Usage ==
Takyehs usually host ta'ziyeh performances.

== Notable takyehs ==
- Takyeh Dowlat in Tehran
- Takyeh Mir Chakhmaq in Yazd
- Takyeh Moaven-ol-Molk in Kermanshah
- Takyeh Beyglarbeygi in Kermanshah
