= Takyeh Moaven-ol-Molk =

Historic building in Kermanshah, Iran

Coordinates: 34.313551°N 47.070376°E

Takyeh Moaven-ol-olk تکیه معاون‌الملک
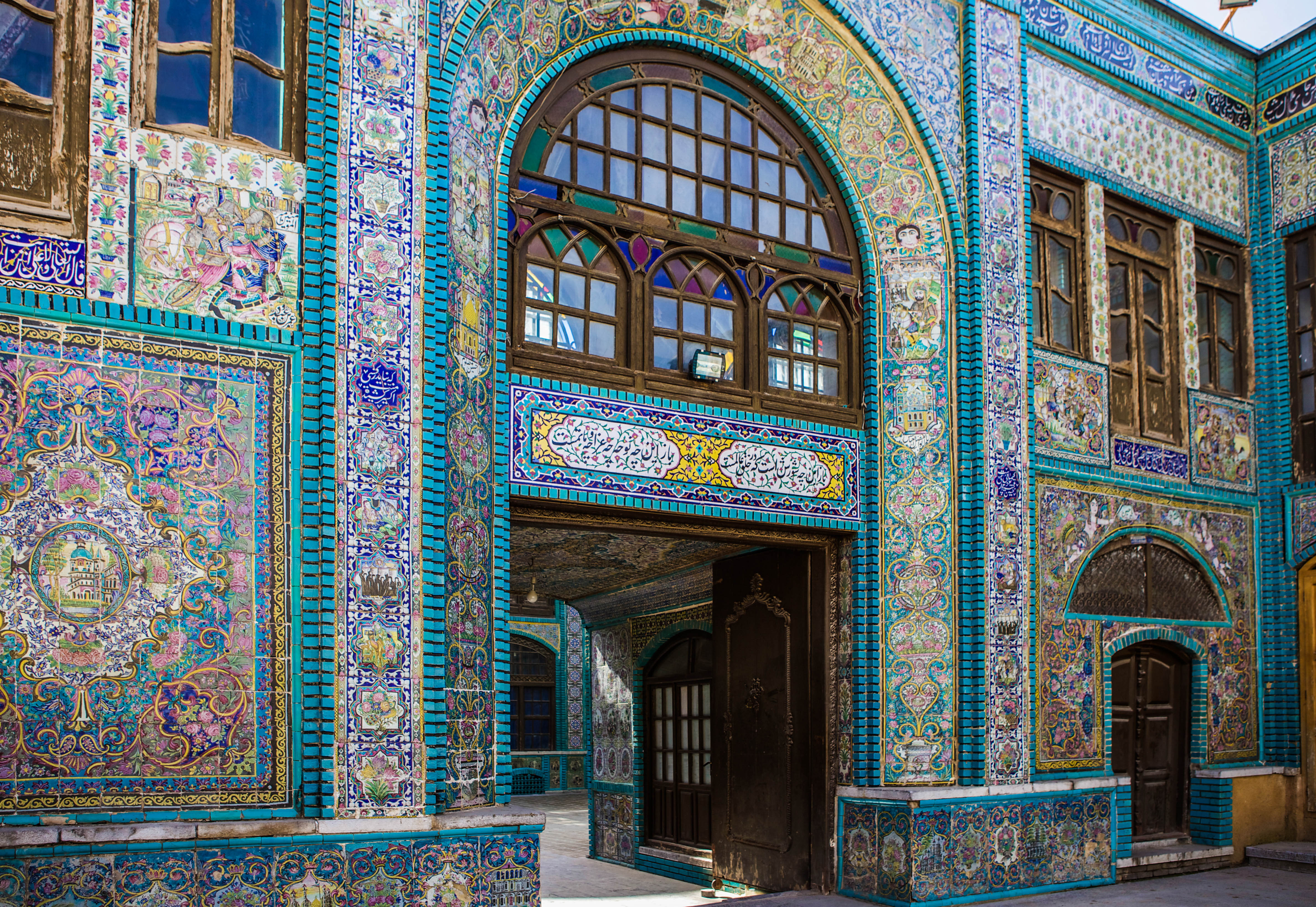

- Location in Iran
- Location: Kermanshah, Iran

History
- Built: 1903

Site notes
- Architect(s): Hossein naghash e tehrani Seyed abulqsem mani Hossein khan Moein al-roaya
- Architectural style: Persian architecture

Takyeh Moaven-ol-Molk (Persian: تکیه معاون الملک) is a takyeh and historic building in Kermanshah, Iran. It was built during the Qajar era as a Shia mourning site. On 1 December 1975, Takyeh Moaven-ol-Molk was recognized as a National monument of Iran. During the Persian Constitutional Revolution, the building suffered significant damage. Later it was renovated.

== Description ==
The building, which lies six metres lower than ground level, has three parts: Hussainiya, Zaeynabiya and Abbasiya. Museum of Anthropology of Kermanshah, and Clothes and Jewelry Museum of Kermanshah are located in the Abbasiya.

The walls of the Hossainieh are covered with multi colored tiles depicting a wild gamut of images including Islamic era Ghazi (warrior), Battle of Karbala and Iranian shahs, shahs of the Shahnameh, European villages, local notables in 19th-century costumes alongside pre-Islamic motifs from the Achaemenid era and Persepolis.

The architect was Asqar Memarbashi whose name has been written in an inscription on the building’s façade.

== Gallery ==
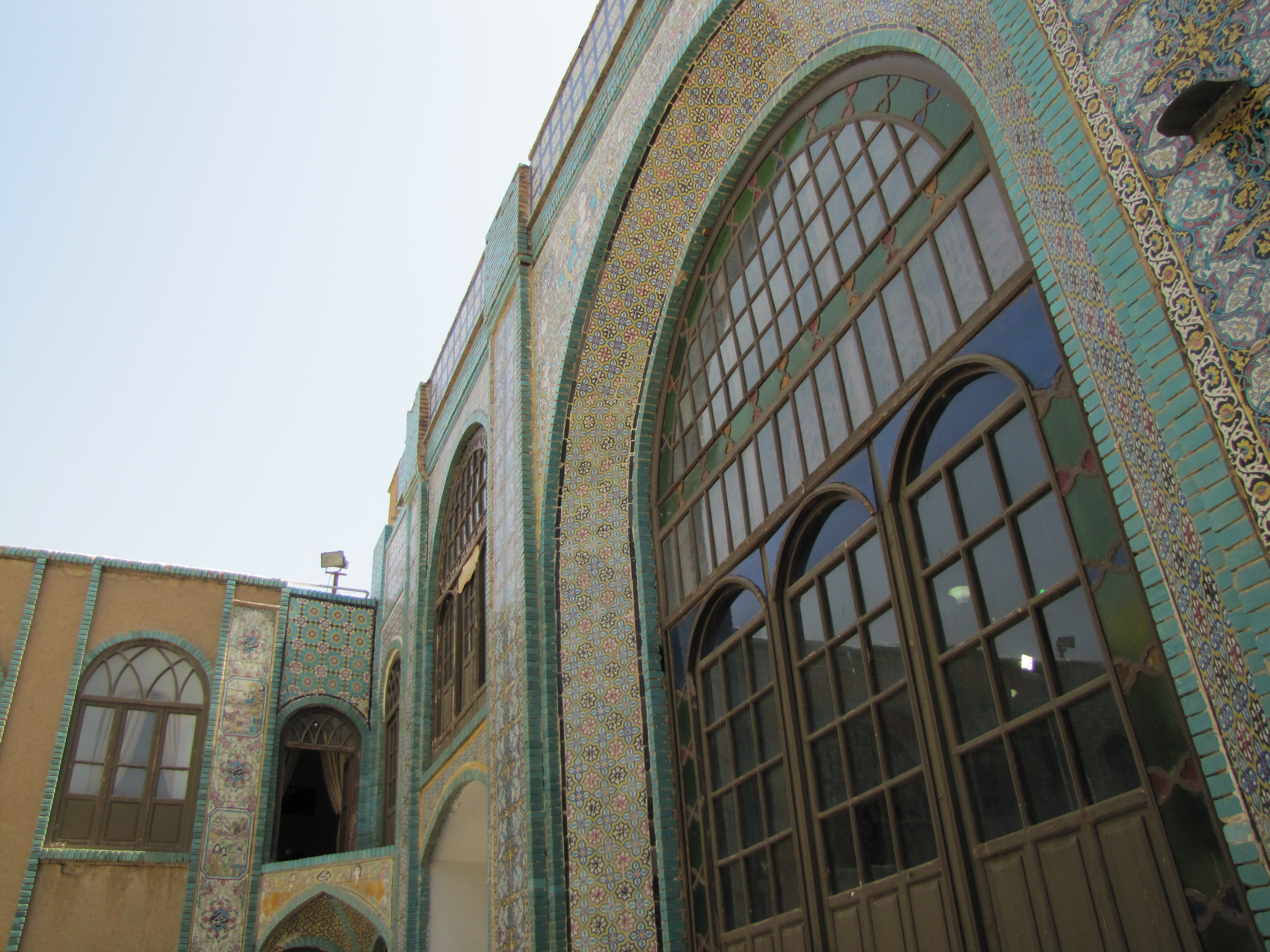

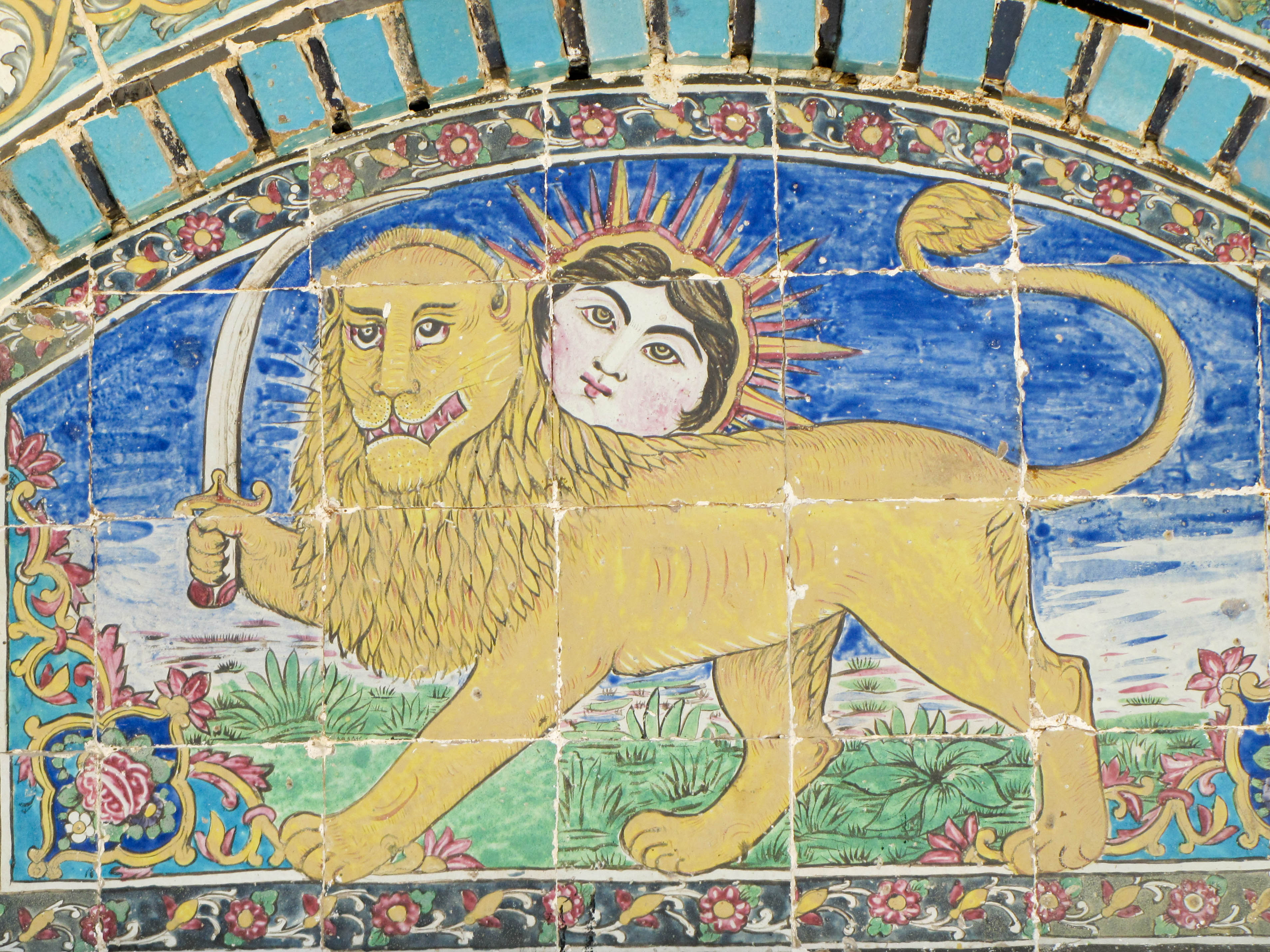
Lion and Sun

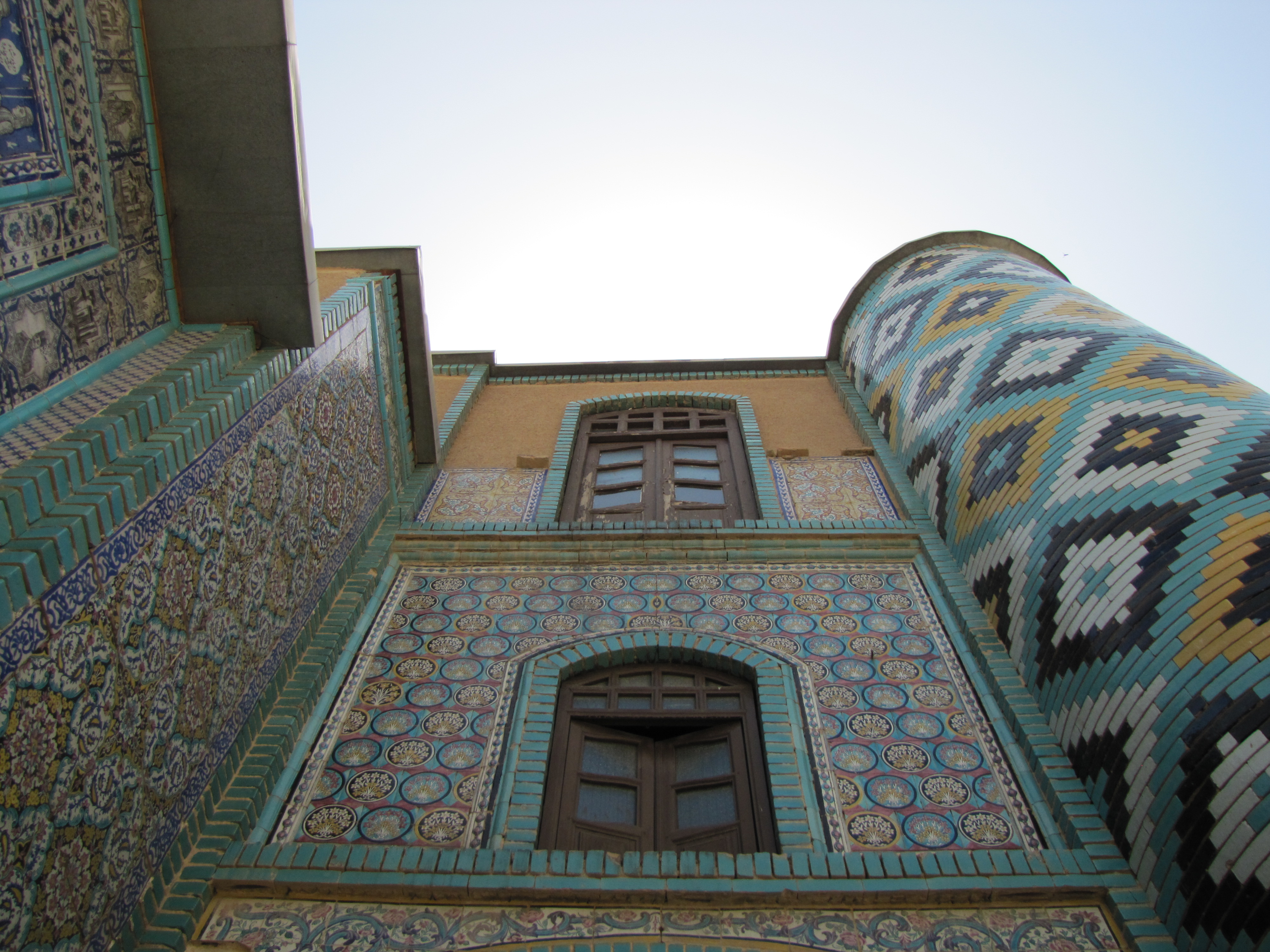

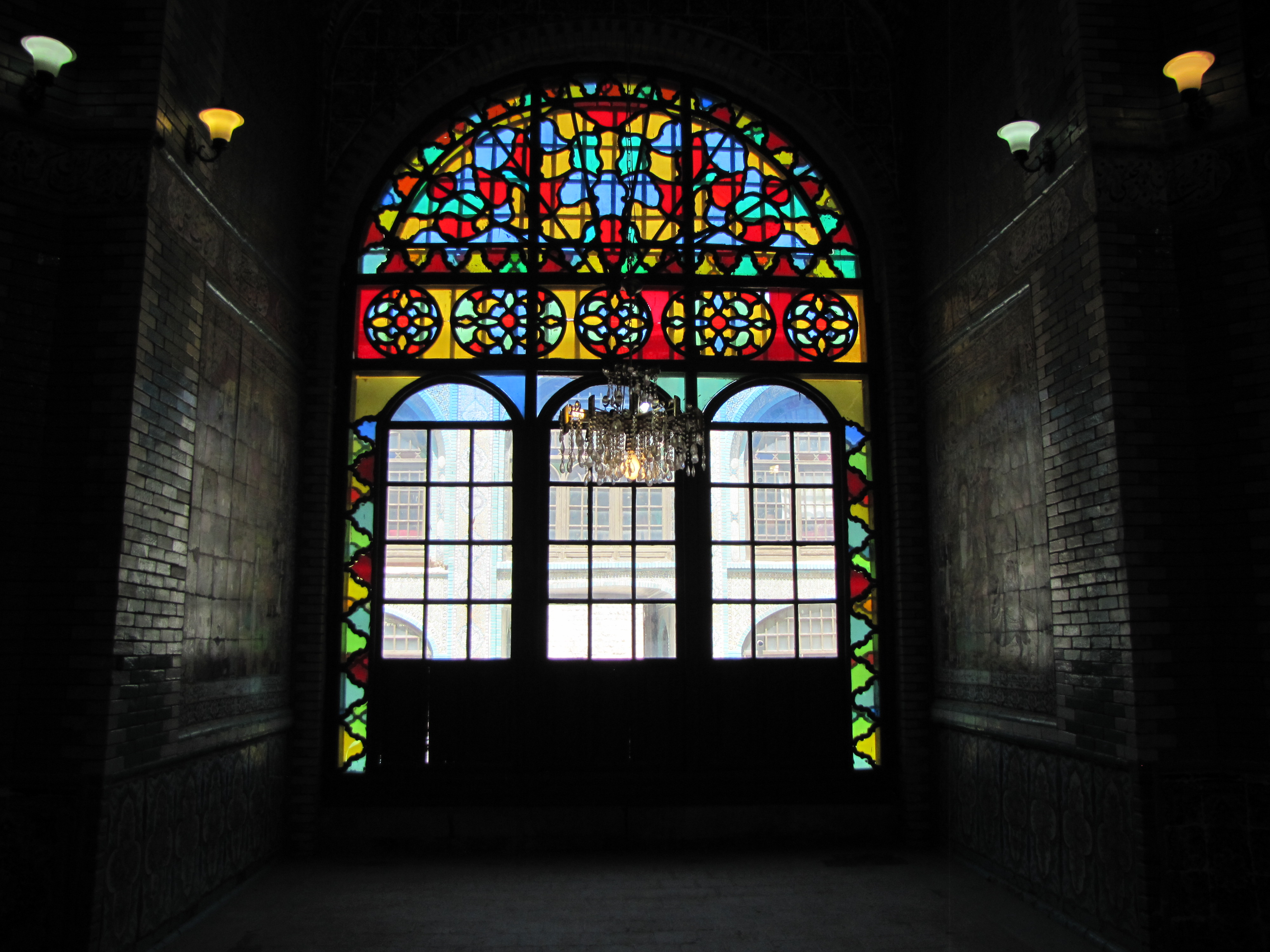

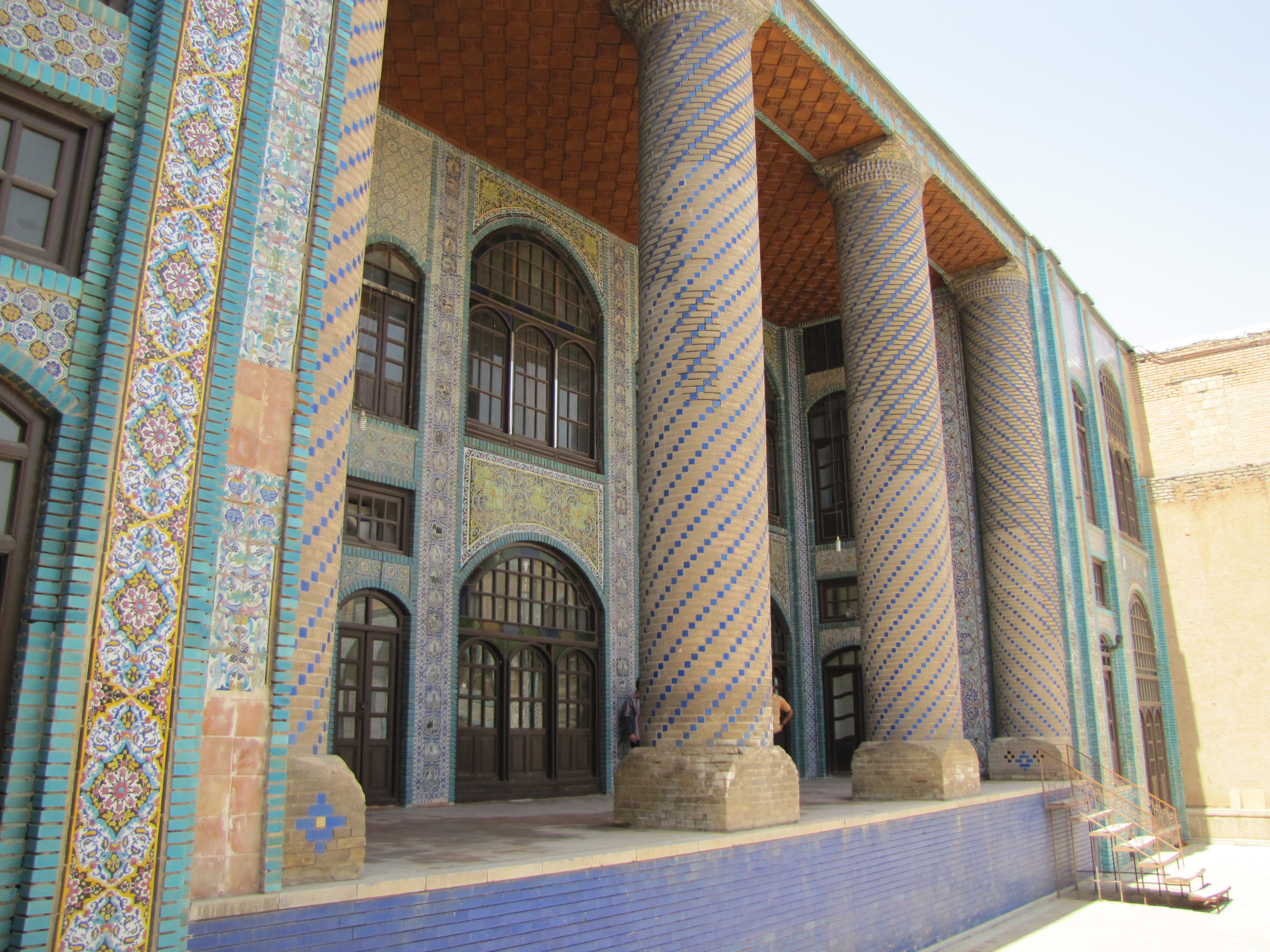
Abbasiya

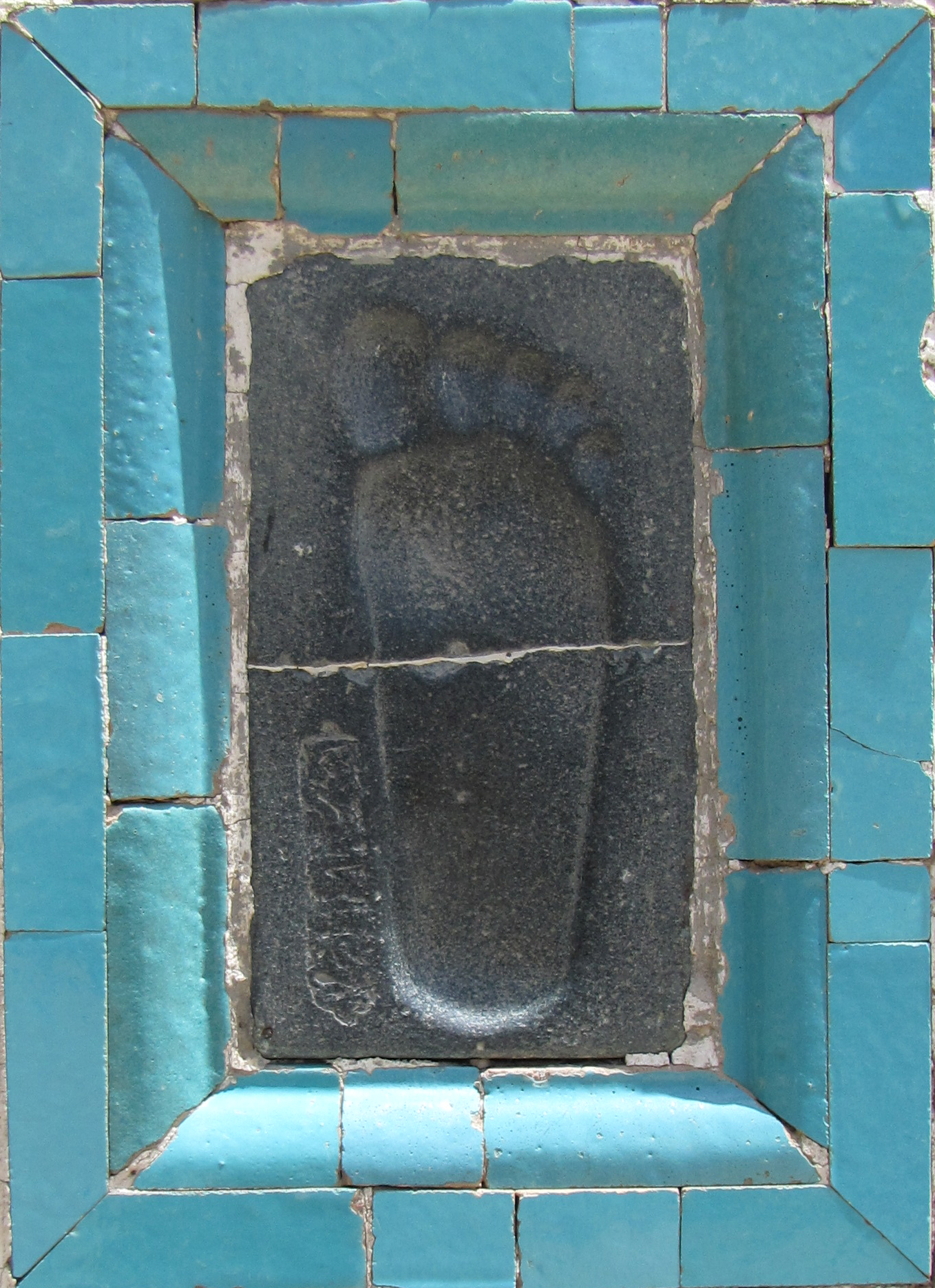
According to indigenous people's beliefs this heritage is sanctificated by the 8th Shia Imam

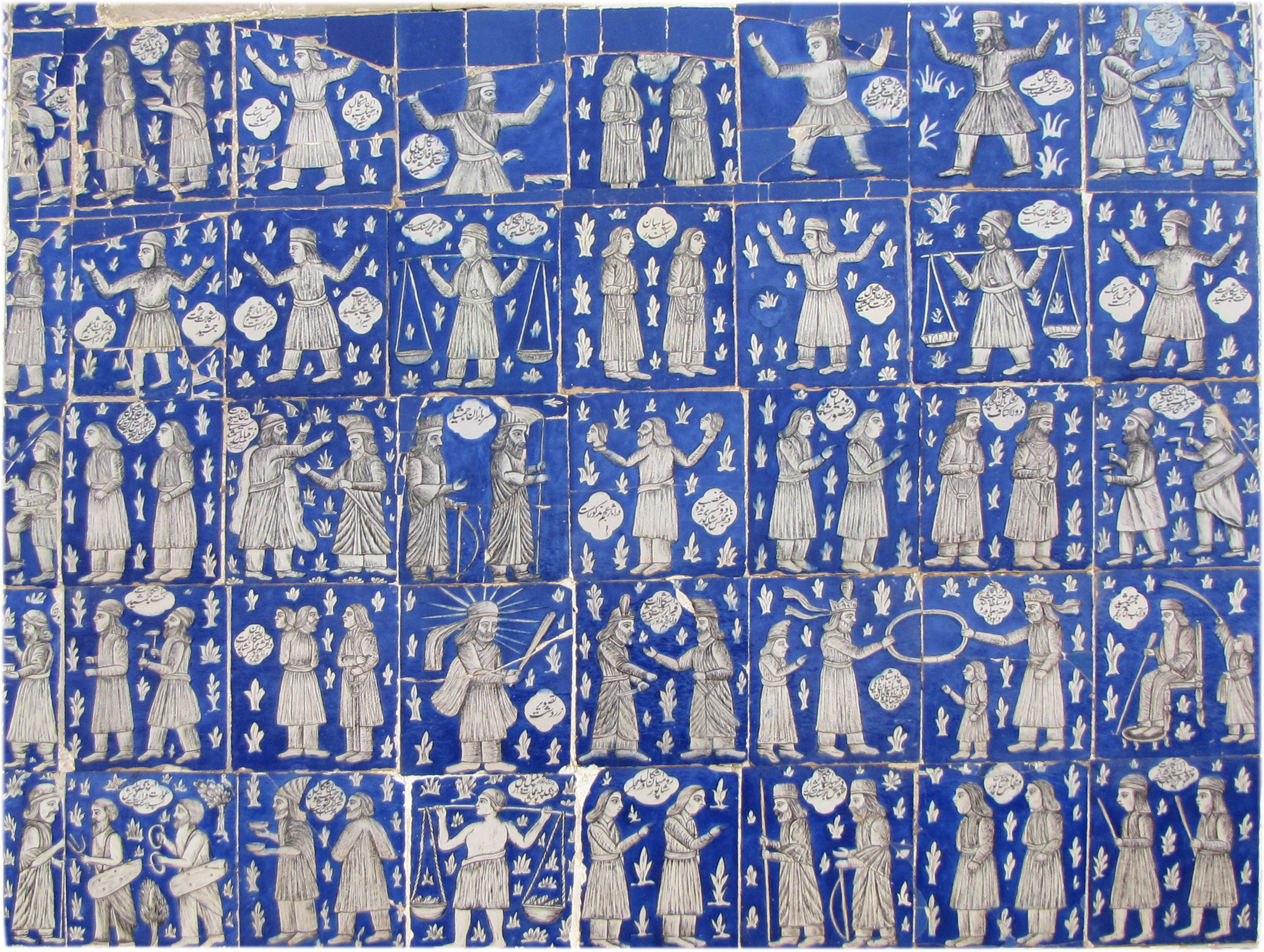
Ancient history of Iran

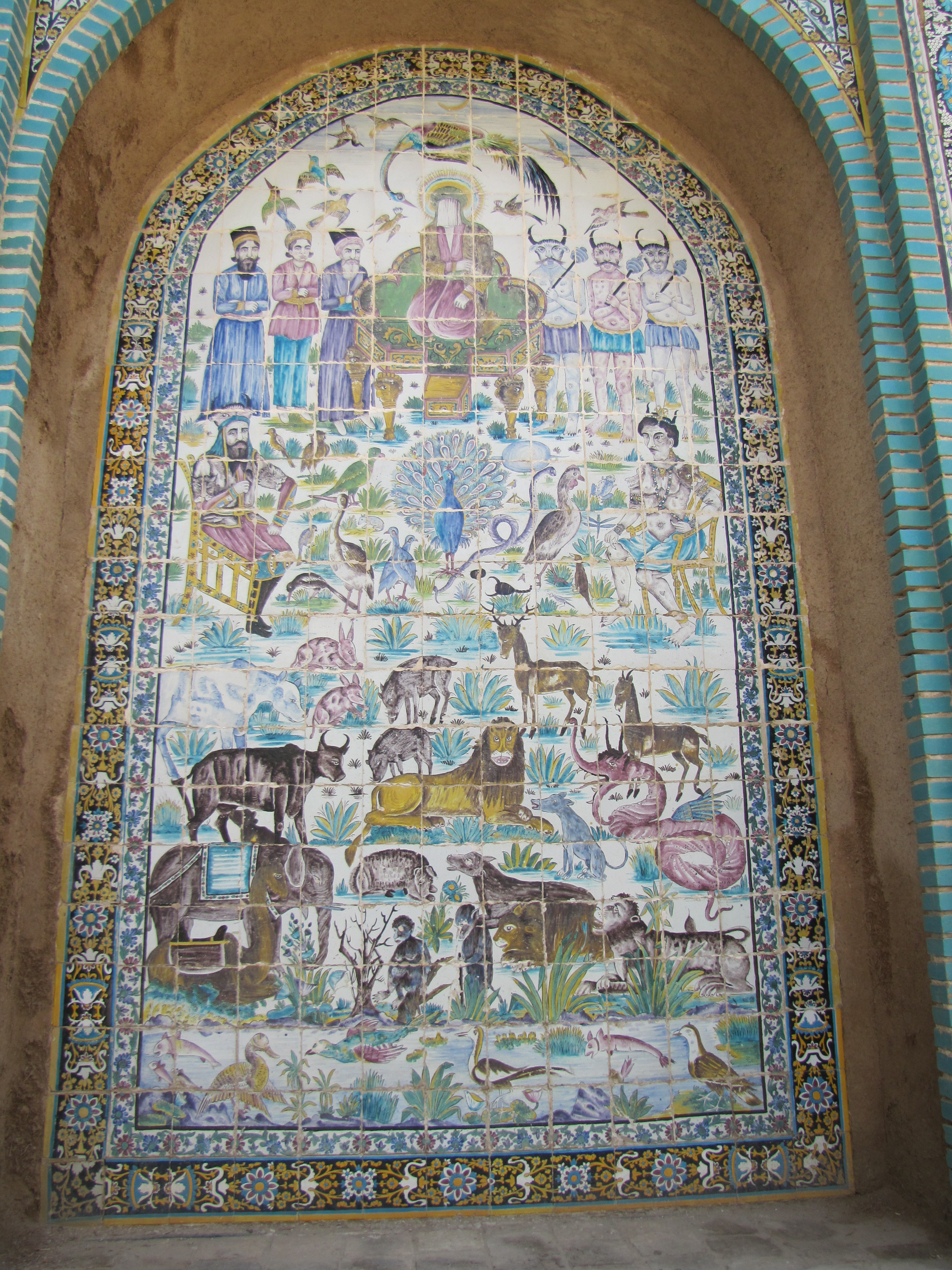

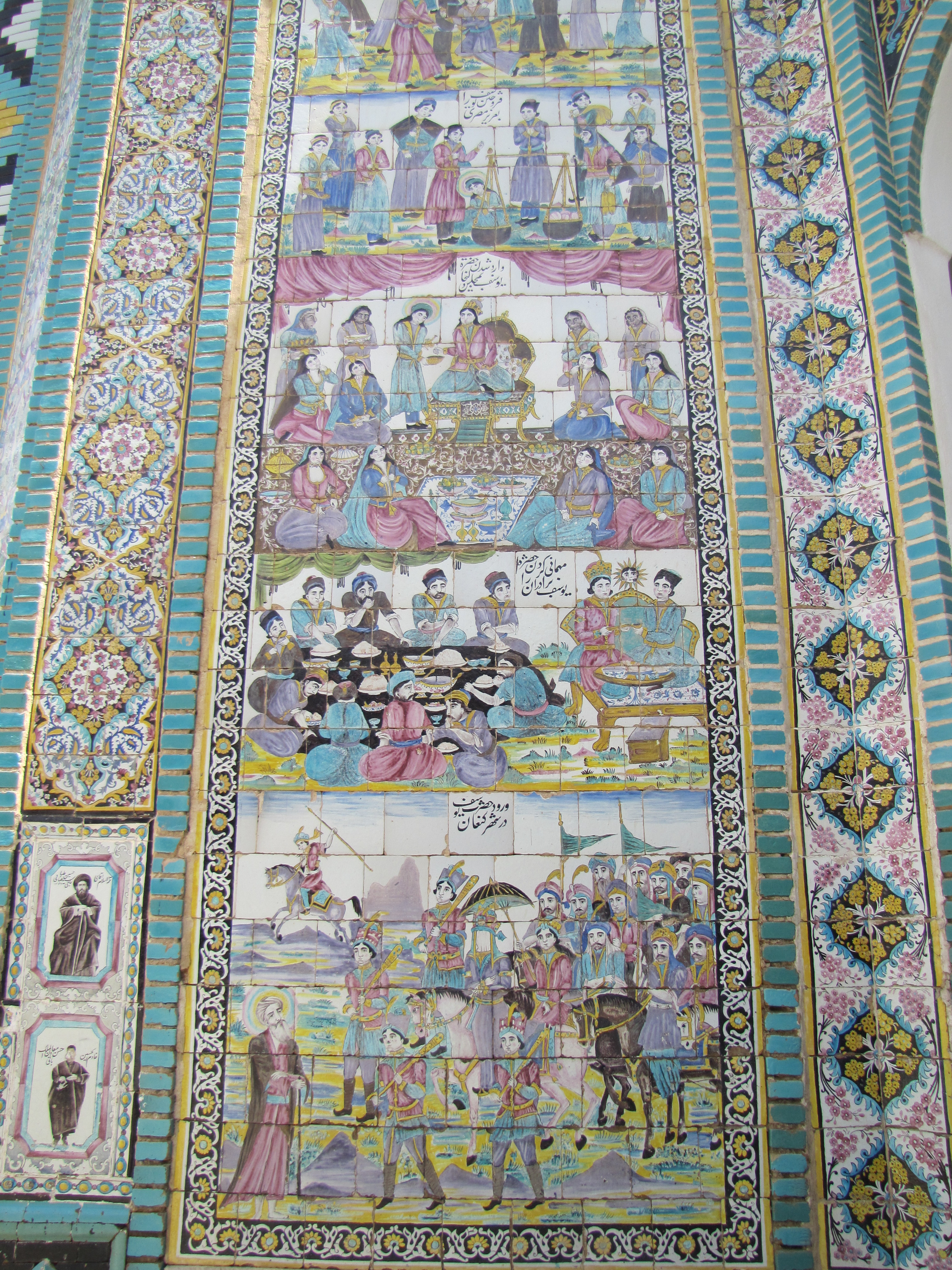
Story of Joseph

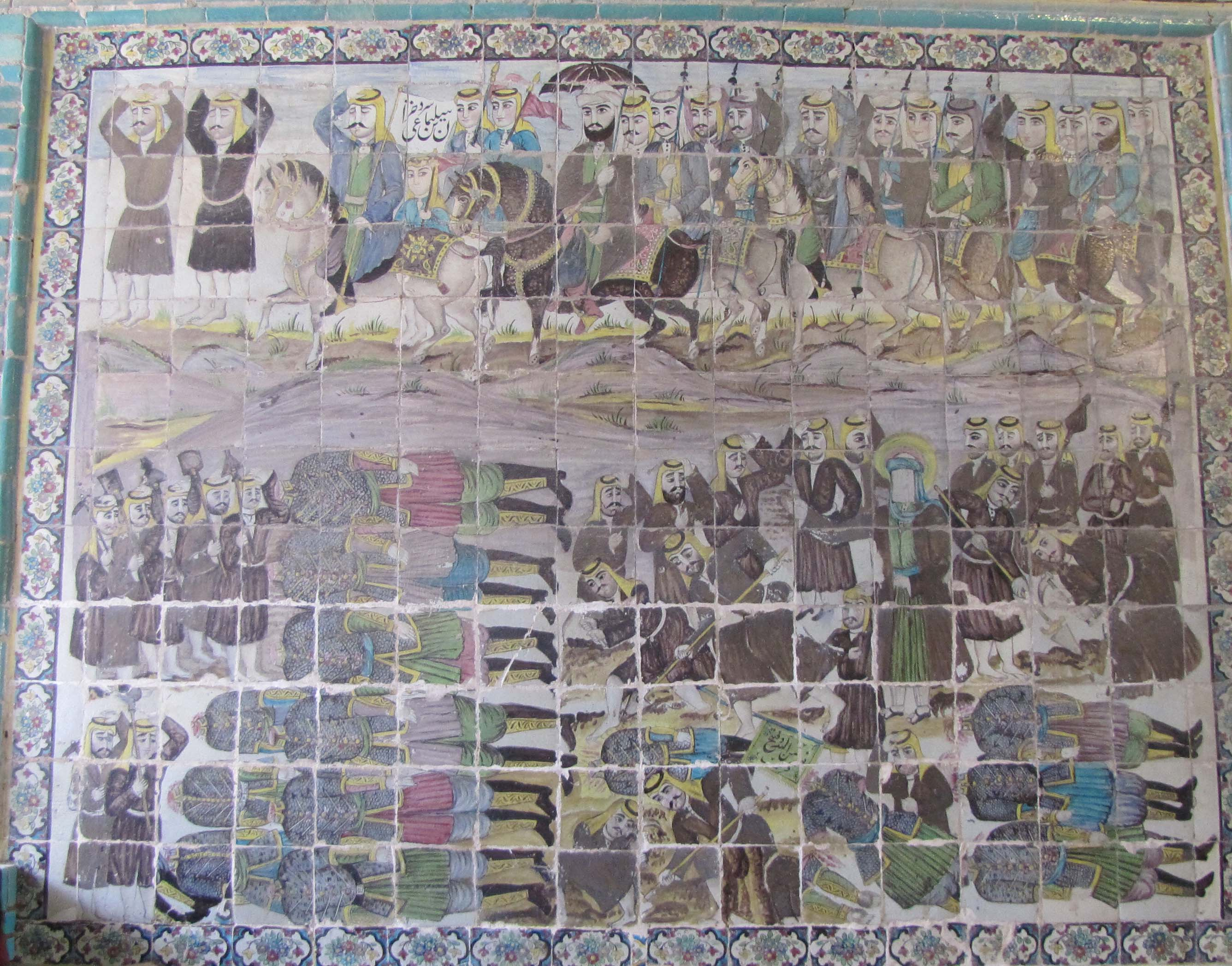
Story of Soleiman ibn sor'al-khaza'i

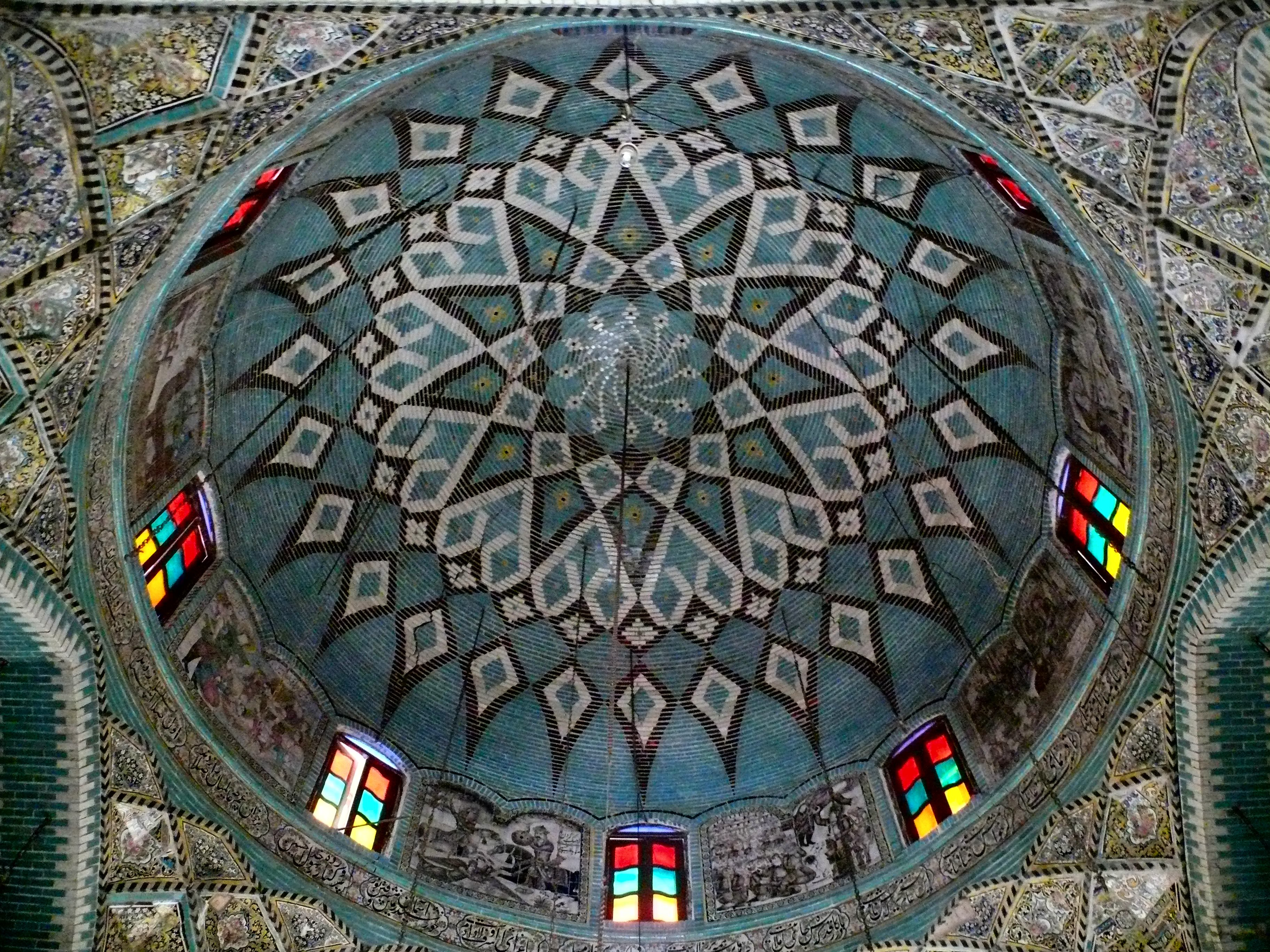
Interior of the dome
