= Takyeh Dowlat =

Royal takyeh in Tehran, Iran

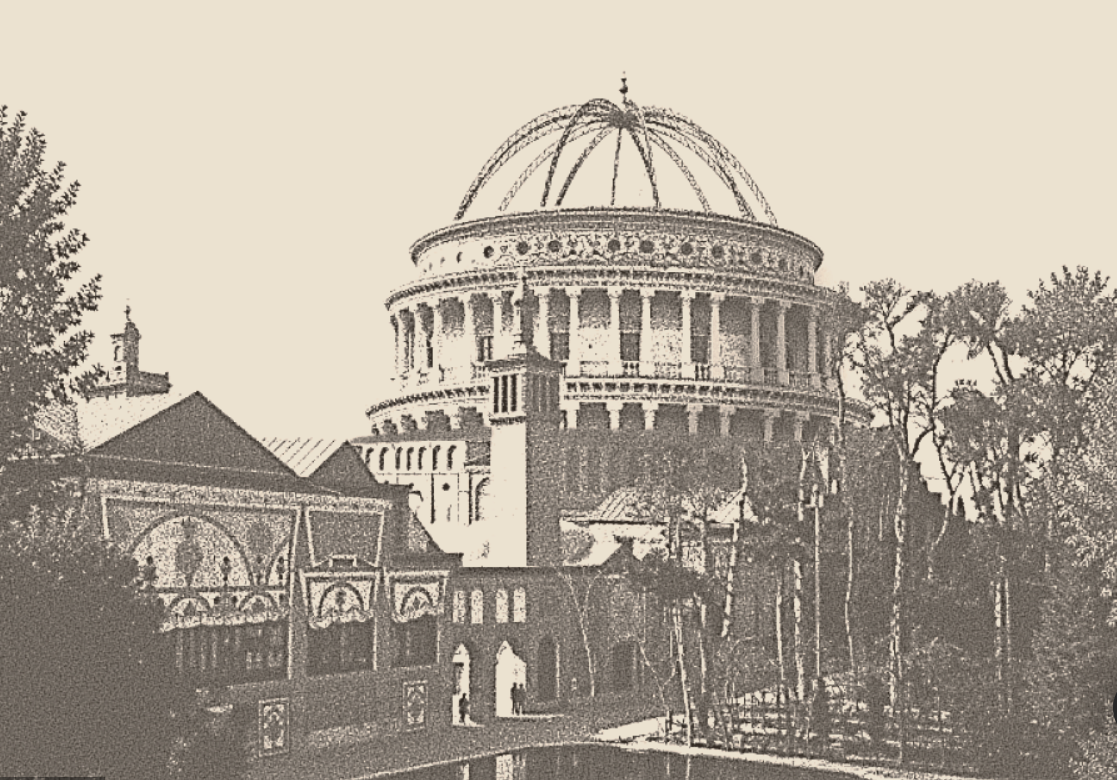
- Exterior of the Takyeh Dowlat, photographed by Abdollah Mirza Qajar
- Interactive map of Takyeh Dowlat
- Location: Tehran, Iran
- Coordinates: 35°40′42.65″N 51°25′15.93″E
- Owner: Royal court of Iran (Qajar dynasty)
- Events: Takyeh; Theatre; First Constituent assembly of Iran

Construction
- Opened: 1868
- Demolished: 1946
- Architectural style: Qajaresque Neo-Baroque architecture
- Architect: Hossein-Ali Mehrin

The Takyeh Dowlat (Persian: تکیه دولت, lit. 'State Takyeh') was a royal theater in Tehran, built in 1868 by the order of Naser al-Din Shah Qajar. With a capacity for 20,000 people, it was the largest theater in the history of Iran. The theater's sumptuous magnificence surpassed that of Europe's greatest opera houses in the opinion of many Western visitors. Samuel Greene Wheeler Benjamin said on his first visit that it was comparable to Verona Arena.

== History ==
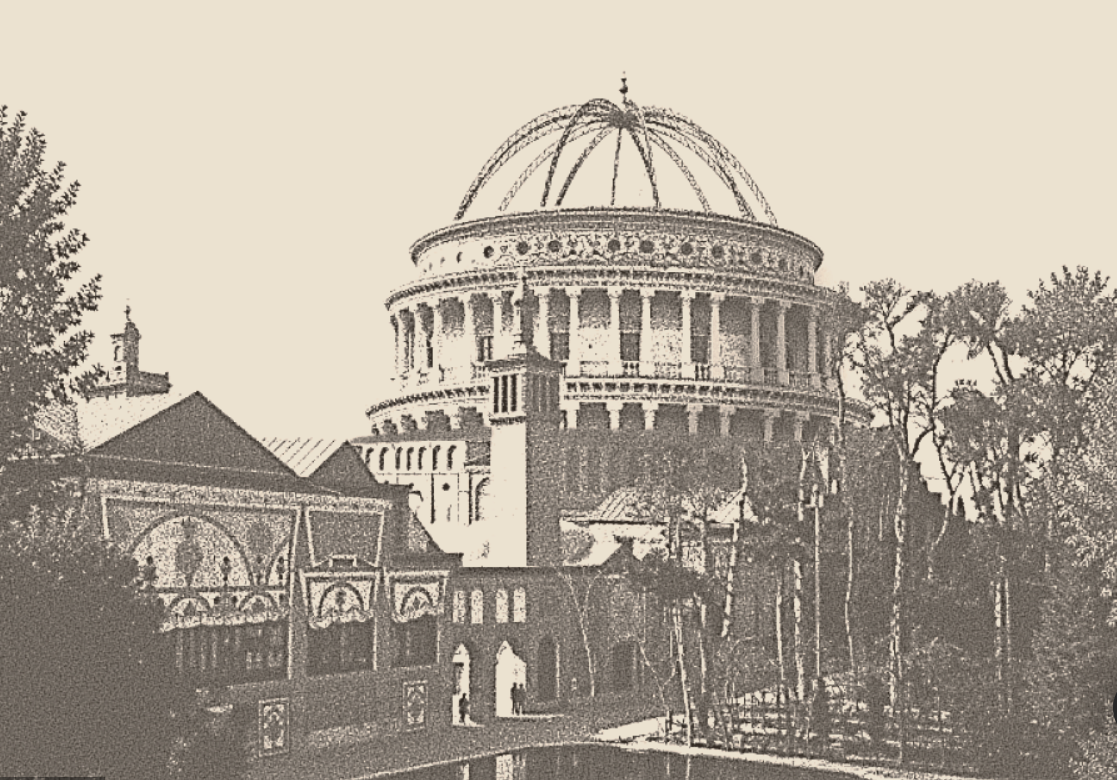
View of Takyeh Dowlat from Golestan Palace.

According to Karim Pirnia, Hossein-Ali Mehrin was the architect of this building. The theater shortly had a colossal 24-meters-tall Rotunda and carried a steel dome, before both were demolished in the late 19th century, fearing that the pressure would damage the roof of the theater itself.

After the assassination of Naser al-Din Shah Qajar in 1896, the importance and glory of Persian theatre gradually lost support from the court and the royal theater hosted the Senate of Iran. In 1925, it was from this theater that Reza Shah proclaimed the downfall of the Qajar dynasty. In 1948 the Takyeh Dowlat was finally demolished.

== Notable events ==
It was here that Reza Shah proclaimed the downfall of the Qajar dynasty. The Takyeh Dowlat was destroyed in 1947 and a bank building was constructed on its site.

== Gallery ==
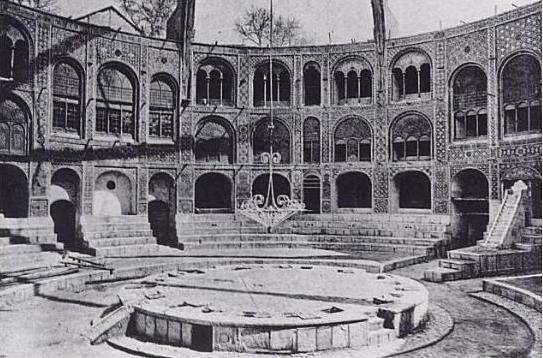
The Takyeh Dowlat, Tehran, Iran.

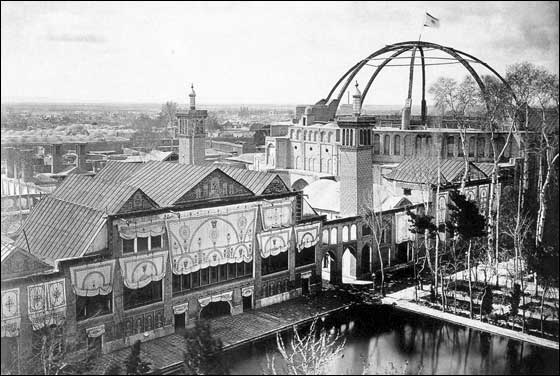
The Takyeh Dowlat adjacent to Emarat-e Bādgīr (the Windcatcher Mansion) in Golestan Palace

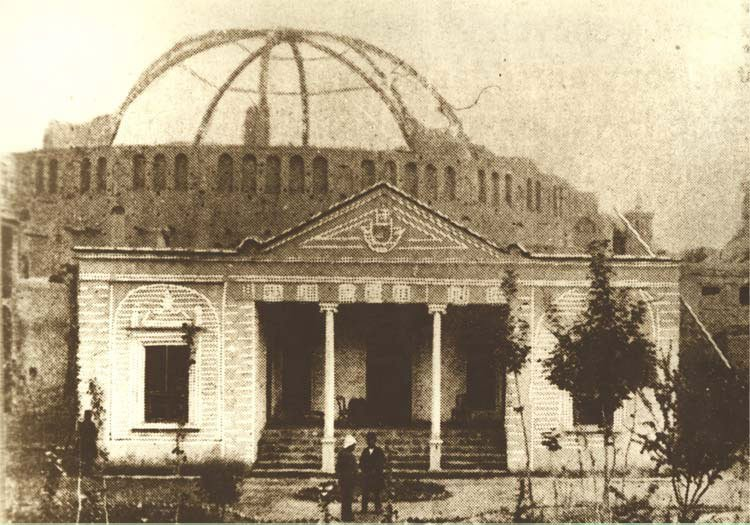
Main Entrance

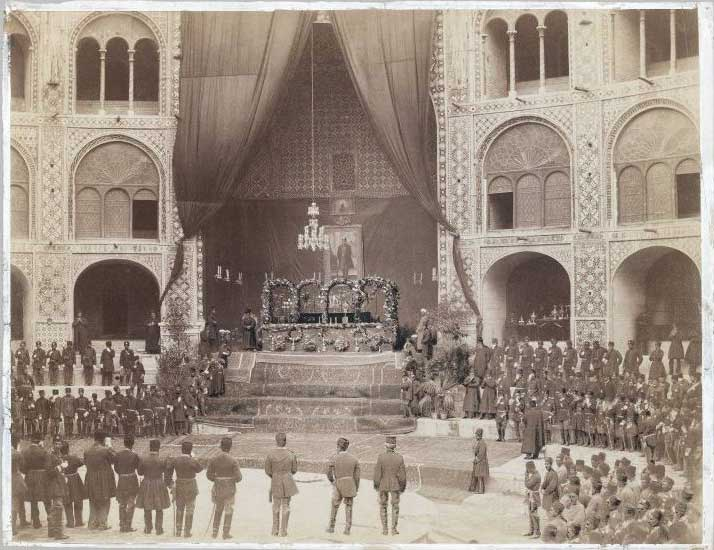
Naser al-Din Shah Qajar's funeral at the Takyeh Dowlat

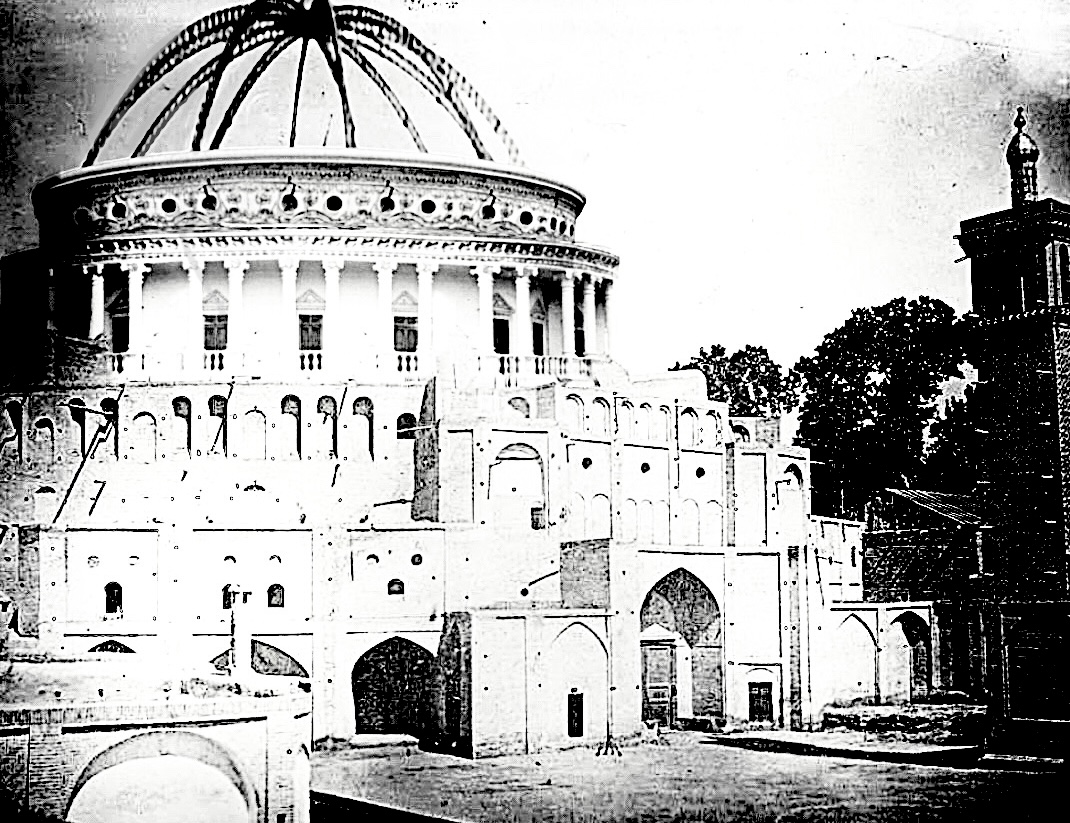

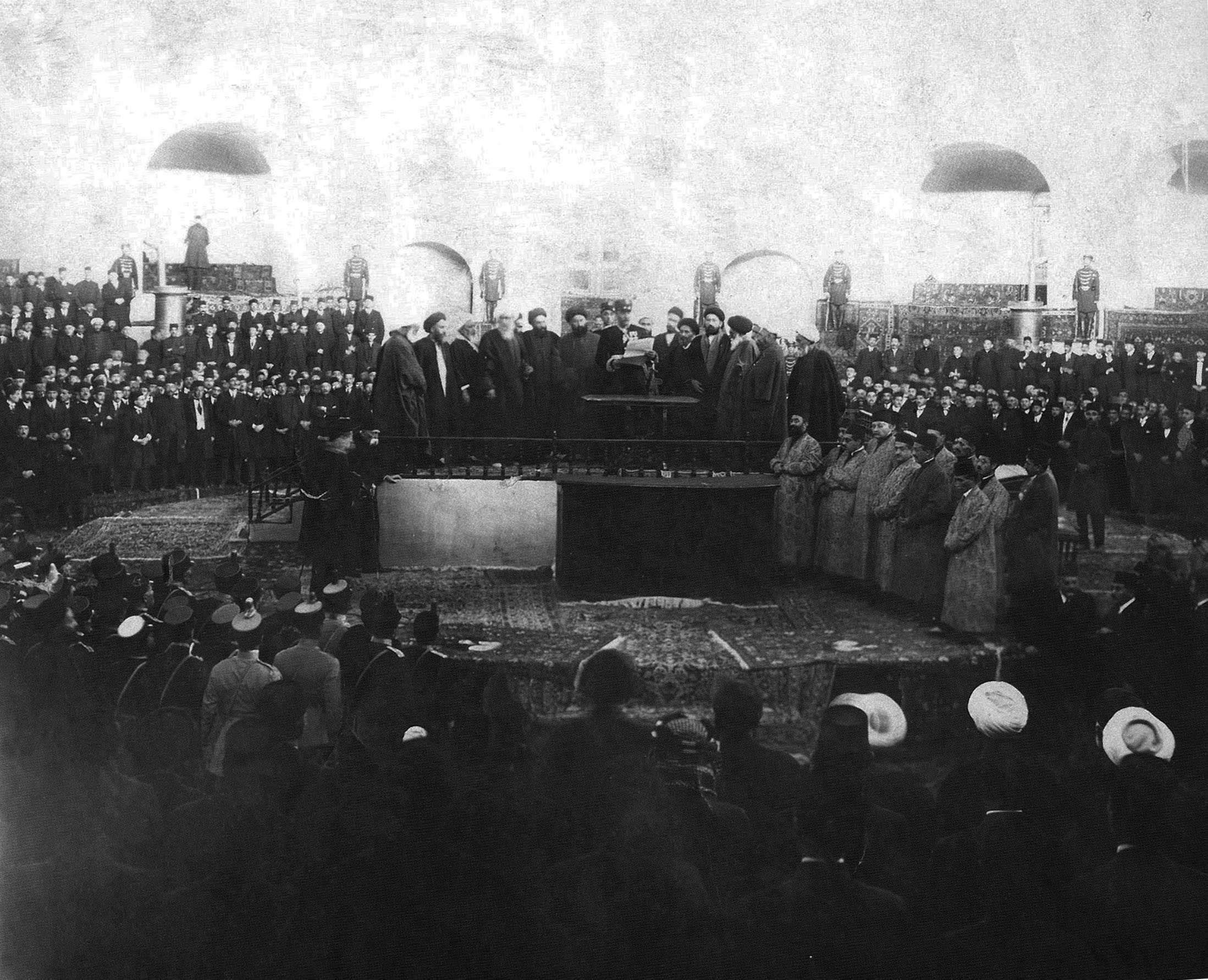
Reza Shah taking an oath at the Constituent assembly

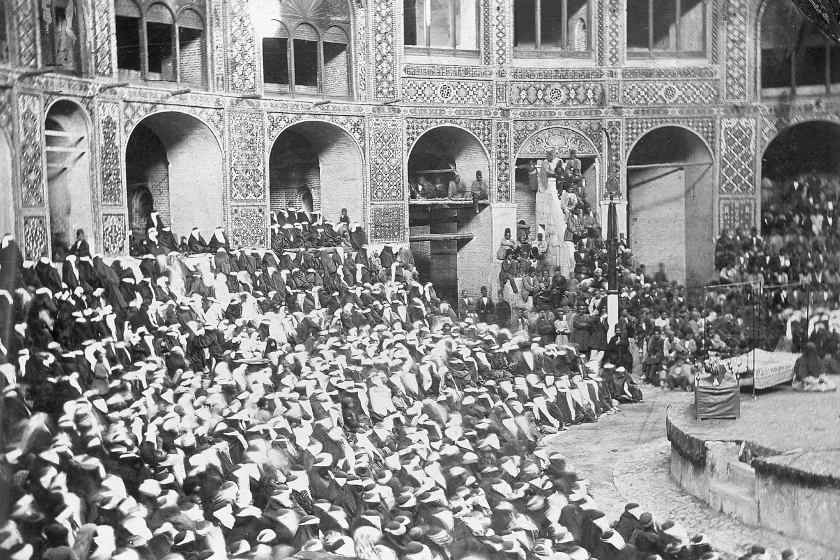
Spectators at the Takyeh Dowlat

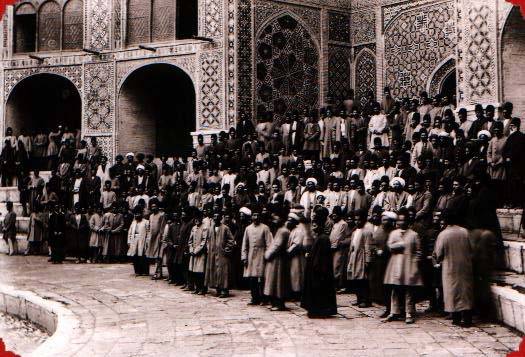
