= Peter J. Chelkowski =

Polish-American scholar of Iranian and Islamic studies

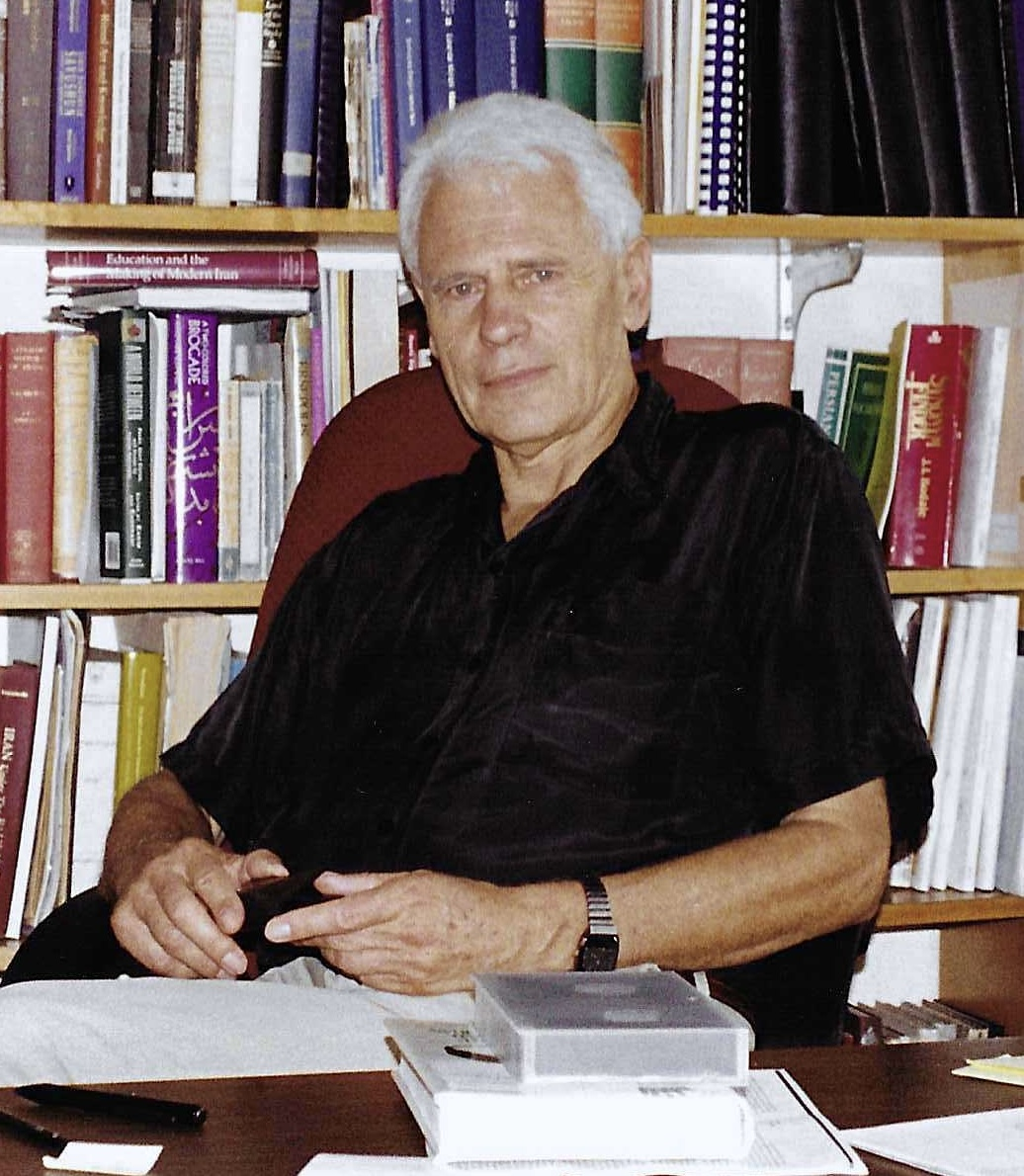
- Born: Piotr Jan Chełkowski; 10 July 1933; Lubliniec, Poland
- Died: 21 October 2024 (aged 91); Turin, Italy

Academic background
- Education: Jagiellonian University; SOAS University of London; University of Tehran (PhD)

Academic work
- Institutions: New York University

Peter J. Chelkowski (born Piotr Jan Chełkowski, Polish: [pjɔtr jan xɛwˈkɔfski]; 10 July 1933 – 21 October 2024) was a Polish-American scholar of Iranian and Islamic studies. He is best known for his research on ta'ziyeh, the traditional Iranian dramatic art form commemorating the martyrdom of Husayn ibn Ali.

Chelkowski was born in Lubliniec, Poland. He studied theater at the School of Dramatic Arts in Kraków (1955–1956) and earned a Master's in Oriental Studies at the Jagiellonian University (1953–1958), where he developed his interests in Persian literature and drama. He continued at the SOAS University of London (1959–1962) under Bernard Lewis and Ann K. S. Lambton. In the 1960s, he went to Iran, perfected his Persian, and completed a PhD at the University of Tehran on Nizami Ganjavi, becoming the first Polish citizen to earn a doctorate in Iranian studies there.

Chelkowski joined New York University's Department of Middle Eastern and Islamic Studies in 1967 and remained there until retiring in 2013. He co-founded the Hagop Kevorkian Center for Near Eastern Studies, serving twice as its director (1975–1978, 1988–1991). He was also chair of the Department of Near Eastern Languages and Literatures (1975–1978). He received the Golden Dozen Award for Excellence in Teaching (1989, 1996) and numerous academic honors, including the 2010 Farabi International Award in Iranian and Islamic Studies.

Chelkowski died in Turin, Italy.

== Selected publications ==
- Mirror of the Invisible World: Tales from the Khamseh of Nizami. 1975.
- Taʻziyeh: Ritual and Drama in Iran. New York University Press. 1979. ISBN 0-8147-1375-0.
- "Shia Muslim Processional Performances". TDR. 29 (3): 18–30. Autumn 1985. doi:10.2307/1145650.
- "Narrative Painting and Painting Recitation in Qajar Iran". Muqarnas. 6: 98–111. 1989. doi:10.1163/22118993-90000238. JSTOR 1602284.
- (Co-authored with Hamid Dabashi) Staging a Revolution: The Art of Persuasion in the Islamic Republic of Iran. 1999.
- "ḤOSAYN B. ʿALI iii. THE PASSION OF ḤOSAYN". Encyclopædia Iranica. 2004.
- "From Karbala to New York City: Taʿziyeh on the Move". TDR. 49 (4): 12–14. Winter 2005.
- "Time Out of Memory: Taʿziyeh, the Total Drama". TDR. 49 (4): 15–27. Winter 2005. doi:10.1162/105420405774763050. ISSN 1054-2043. JSTOR 4488675. S2CID 57568526.
- "From the Sun-Scorched Desert of Iran to the Beaches of Trinidad: Taʿziyeh's Journey from Asia to the Caribbean". TDR. 49 (4): 156–170. Winter 2005.
- "TAʿZIA". Encyclopædia Iranica. 2009.
- Chelkowski, Peter J. (2010). "Identification and Analysis of the Scenic Space in Traditional Iranian Theatre". In Chelkowski, Peter J. (ed.). Eternal Performance: Ta'ziyeh and Other Shiite Rituals. India: Seagull. pp. 92–105. ISBN 978-1-9064-9-751-4.

== Awards ==
- Commander's Cross of the Order of Merit of the Republic of Poland (2011)

== Sources ==
- Beeman, W. O. (2025). "Peter J. Chelkowski (1933–2024)" (PDF). Journal of Persianate Studies. 18 (1–2): 253–257. doi:10.1163/18747167-bja10056.
- Sonboldel, Farshad (2024). "Professor Emeritus Peter J. Chelkowski" (PDF). Iranian Studies. 57 (3): 493–494. doi:10.1017/irn.2024.56.
