= Kermanshah =

City in Kermanshah province, Iran

Kermanshah: کرمانشاه (Persian); کرماشان (Southern Kurdish)
- City
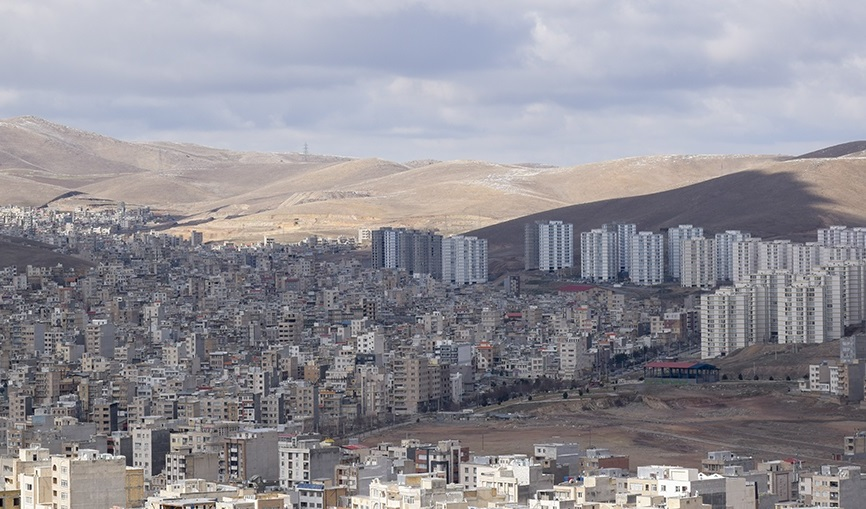
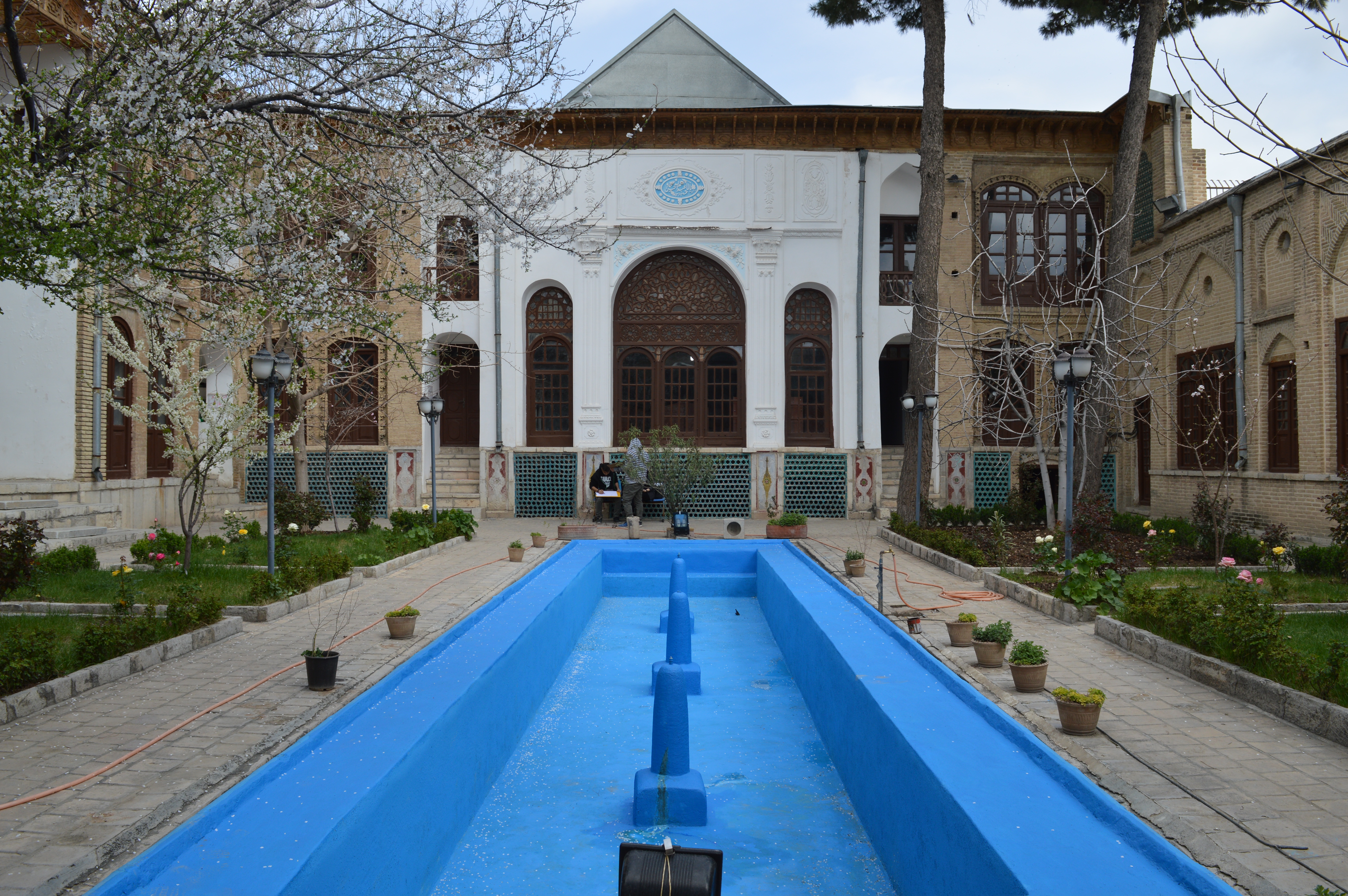
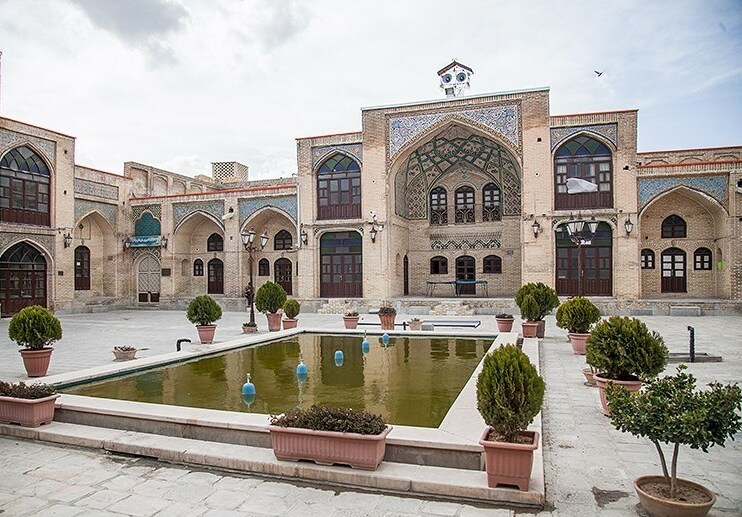
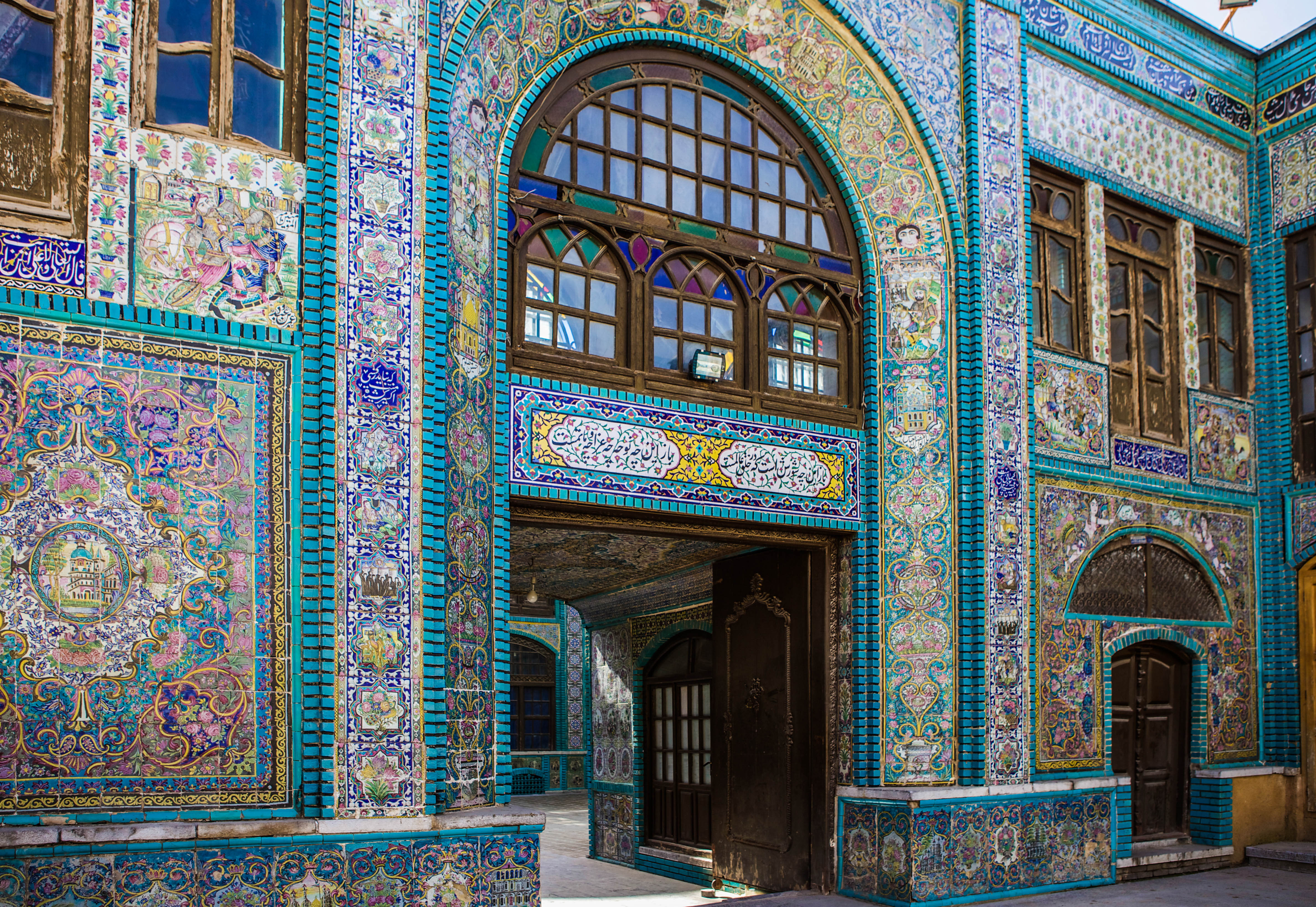
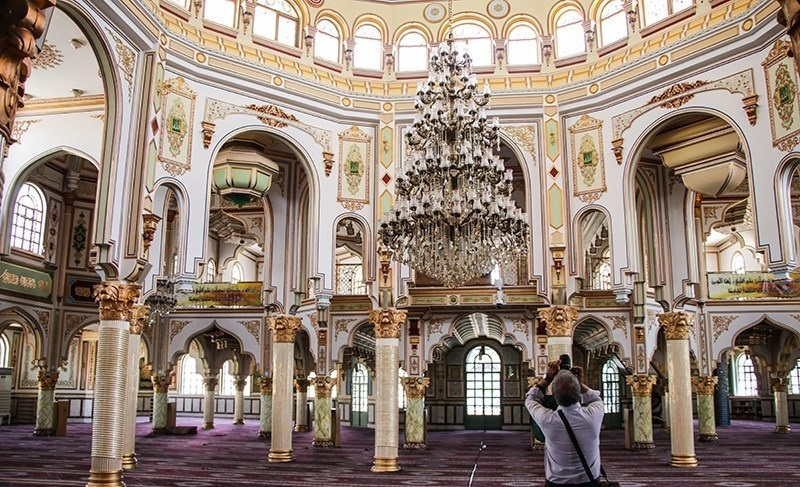
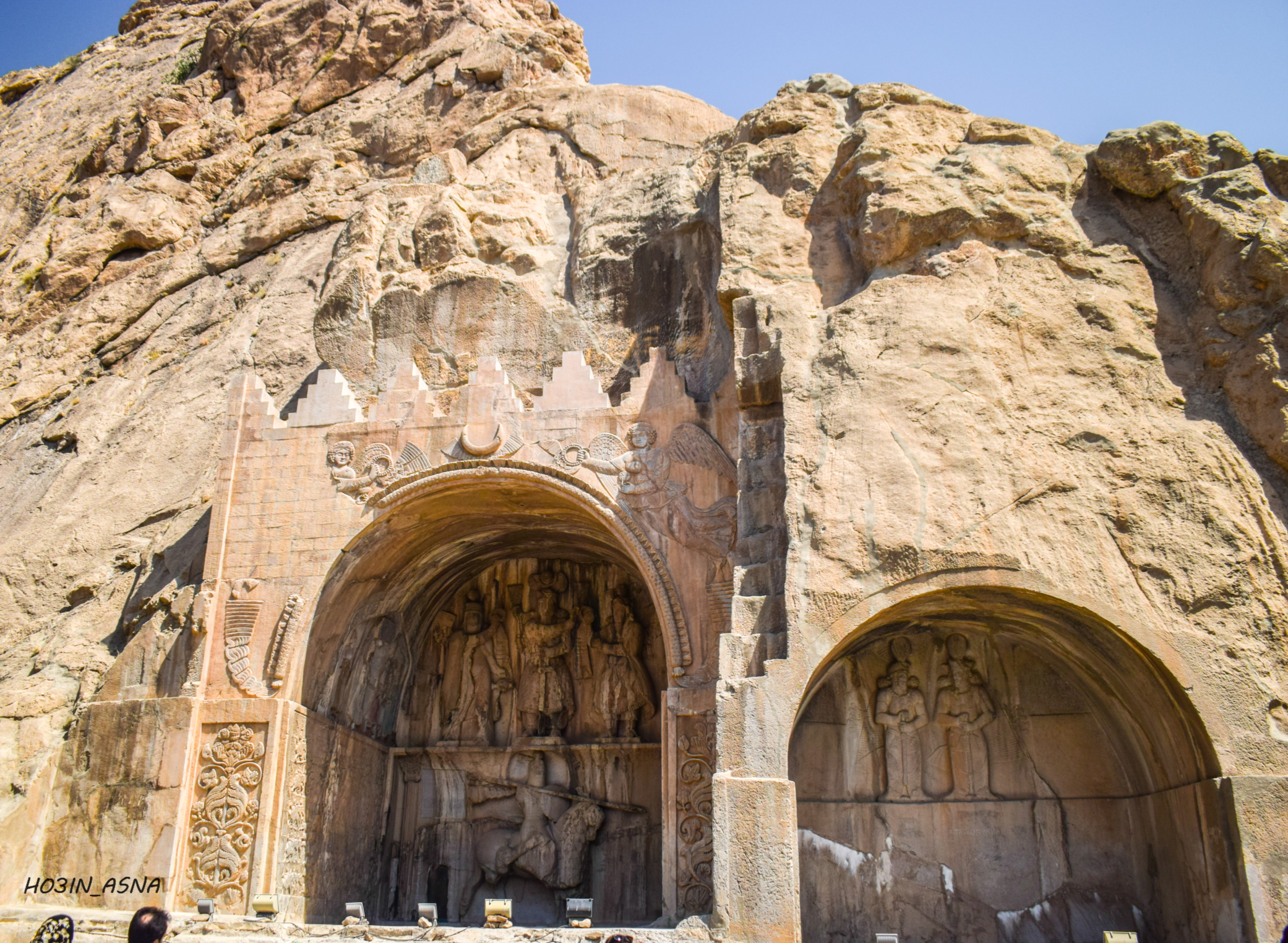
- Skyline of Kermanshah Takyeh Beyglarbeygi Emad od-Dowleh Mosque Takyeh Moaven-ol-Molk Jameh Mosque of Shafei Taq-e Bostan

- Seal
- Nicknames: The Land of History & Myths; The Land of Eternal Lovers; The Land of Shirin & Farhad
- Interactive map of Kermanshah
- Location within Iran
- Coordinates: 34°20′13″N 47°05′28″E
- Country: Iran
- Province: Kermanshah
- County: Kermanshah
- District: Central
- Established date: 390 AD

Government
  - Mayor: Nader Norouzi
- Elevation: 1,350 m (4,430 ft)

Population (2016)
  - Urban: 946,651
  - Metro: 1,083,833
  - Demonym: Kermashani Kermanshahi
- Time zone: UTC+3:30 (IRST)
- Postal code: 67146
- Area code: 083
- Climate: Csa
- Website: kermanshah.ir

Kermanshah (Persian: کرمانشاه, romanized: Kermânšâh, pronounced [kʰʲeɾmɒːnˈʃɒːʰ]; Southern Kurdish: کرماشان, romanized: Kirmaşan.) is a city in the Central District of Kermanshah province, Iran, serving as capital of the province, the county, and the district. The city is 525 kilometres (326 miles) from Tehran in the western part of the country. The 2016 National Census measured the population of the city as 946,651 (2025 estimate 1,117,000).

== Etymology ==
"Kermanshah" derives from the Sasanian era title Kirmanshah, which translates as "King of Kerman". This title was held by the son of Shapur III, Prince Bahram, who was bestowed with the title upon being appointed governor of the province of Kirman (present-day Kerman Province). Later, in 390, when he had already succeeded his father as Bahram IV Kirmanshah (r. 388–399), he founded the city and his title was applied to it, i.e. "(City of the) King of Kirman".

== History ==
Historical population
Year	Pop.	±% p.a.
1986	560,514	—
1991	624,084	+2.17%
1996	692,986	+2.12%
2006	794,863	+1.38%
2011	851,405	+1.38%
2016	946,651	+2.14%

=== Prehistory ===
Kermanshah is considered one of the cradles of prehistoric cultures. According to archaeological surveys and excavation, the Kermanshah area has been occupied by prehistoric people since the Lower Paleolithic period, and continued to later Paleolithic periods until late Pleistocene period. The Lower Paleolithic evidence consists of some hand axes found in the Gakia area to the east of the city. The Middle Paleolithic remains have been found in various parts of the province, especially in the northern vicinity of the city in Tang-e Kenesht, Tang-e Malaverd and near Taq-e Bostan.

Neanderthal Man existed in the Kermanshah region during this period and the only discovered skeletal remains of this early human in Iran was found in three caves and rock shelter situated in Kermanshah province. The known Paleolithic caves in this area are Warwasi, Qobeh, Malaverd and Do-Ashkaft Cave. The region was also one of the first places in which human settlements including Asiab, Qazanchi, Sarab, Chia Jani, and Ganj-Darreh were established between 8,000 and 10,000 years ago.

This is about the same time that the first potteries pertaining to Iran were made in Ganj-Darreh, near present-day Harsin.

In May 2009, based on a research conducted by the university of Hamadan and UCL, the head of Archeology Research Center of Iran's Cultural Heritage and Tourism Organization announced that one of the oldest prehistoric villages in the Middle East dating back to 9800 B.P. was discovered in Sahneh, located west of Kermanshah.

Remains of later village occupations and early Bronze Age are found in a number of mound sites in the city itself.

The city contains 4 archaeological mound sites: Chogha Kaboud, Chogha Golan, Morad Hasel, and Tappa Gawri.

=== Sassanid Kermanshah ===
In ancient Iranian mythology, construction of the city is attributed to Tahmuras, the third king of Pishdadian dynasty. It is believed that the Sasanians have constructed Kermanshah and Bahram IV (he was called Kermanshah, meaning king of Kerman) gave his name to this city.

Kermanshah became the capital city of the Sasanian Empire, as well as being a significant health center for Sasanian kings, serving as their summer resort. In AD 226, following a two-year war led by the Persian Emperor, Ardashir I, against "Kurdish" tribes in the region. At the time, the term "Kurd" was used as a social term, designating Iranian nomads, rather than a concrete ethnic group. The word became an ethnic identity in the 12th and 13th century. Within the dynasty known as the House of Kayus (also Kâvusakân) remained a semi-independent kingdom lasting until AD 380 before Ardashir II removed the dynasty's last ruling member.

=== Islamic era ===
Kermanshah was conquered by the Arabs in 629 AD. Under Seljuk rule in the eleventh century, it became a cultural and commercial center in western Iran and the southern Kurdish-inhabited areas as a whole. It was sacked by the Mongols under Hulegu in 1257, shortly before the sack of Baghdad. The Safavids fortified the town, and the Qajars repulsed an attack by the Ottomans during Fath Ali Shah's rule (1797–1834).

Kermanshah was occupied by Ottomans between 1723–1729 and 1731–1732.

=== Modern history ===
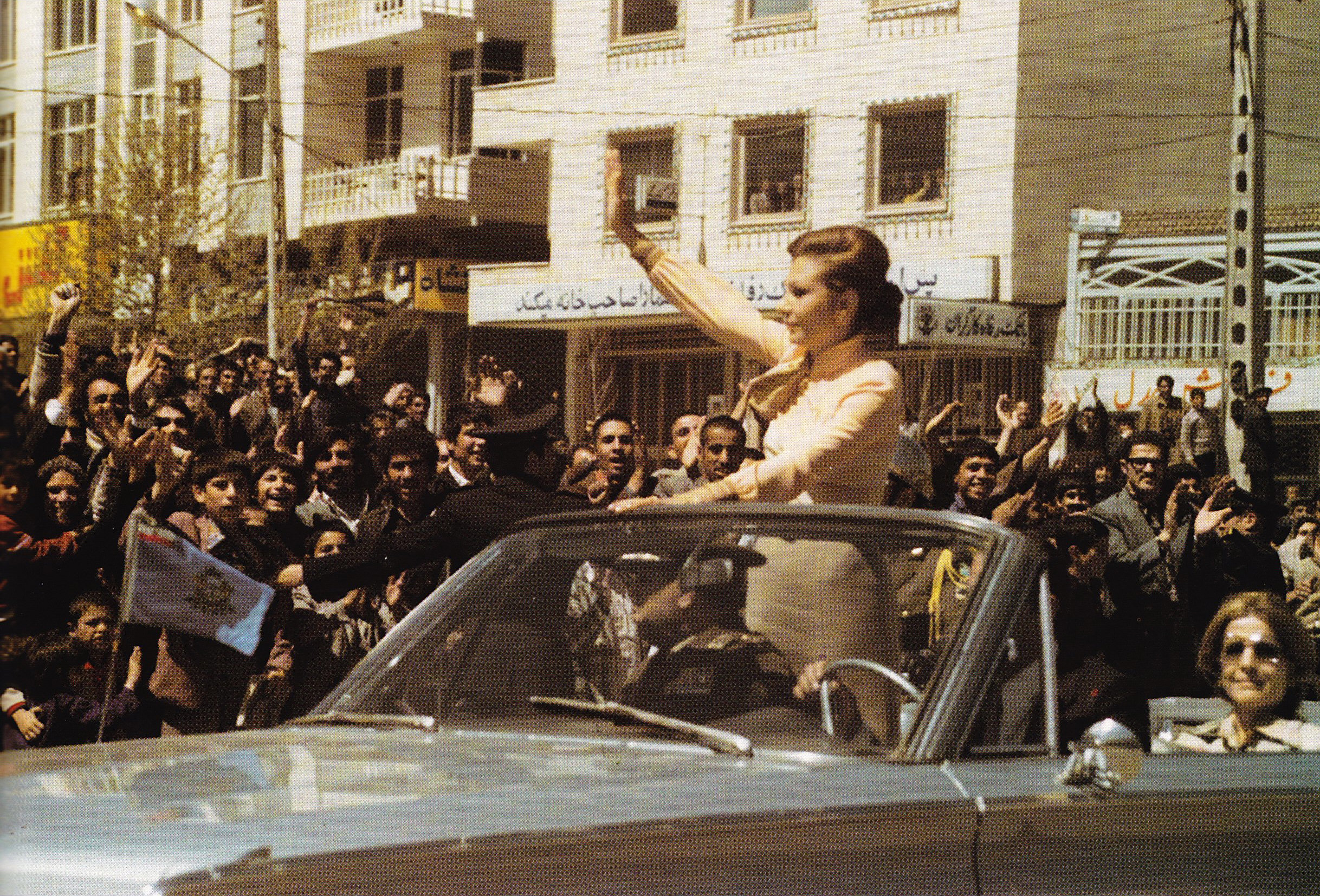
Queen Farah Pahlavi on a visit to Kermanshah, 1963

Occupied by the Imperial Russian Army in 1914, followed by the Ottoman Army in 1915 during World War I, it was evacuated in 1917 when the British forces arrived there to expel the Ottomans. Kermanshah played an important role in the Iranian Constitutional Revolution during the late Qajar era and the Republic Movement in the Pahlavi era. The city was harshly damaged during the Iran–Iraq War in 1980 to 1988, and although it was rebuilt, it has not yet fully recovered.

On 3 January 2026, during the 2025–2026 Iranian protests and 2026 Iran massacres, Reza Ghanbari, a 17-year-old Kurdish minor, was killed during protests in the Jafarabad neighborhood of Kermanshah. Security authorities reportedly pressured the family to describe Ghanbari as affiliated with the Basij and to attribute his death to protesters, which the family declined. On 8 January, five protesters were killed by gunfire by government security forces and ten members of the Kermanshah Nabi Akram Corps were killed in Kermanshah.

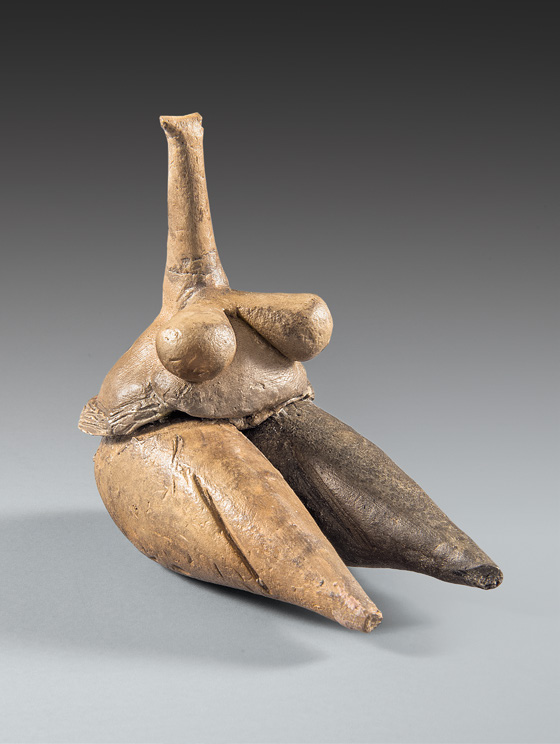
Clay human figurine (Fertility goddess) Tappeh Sarab, Kermanshah, c. 7000–6100 BCE, Neolithic period, National Museum of Iran

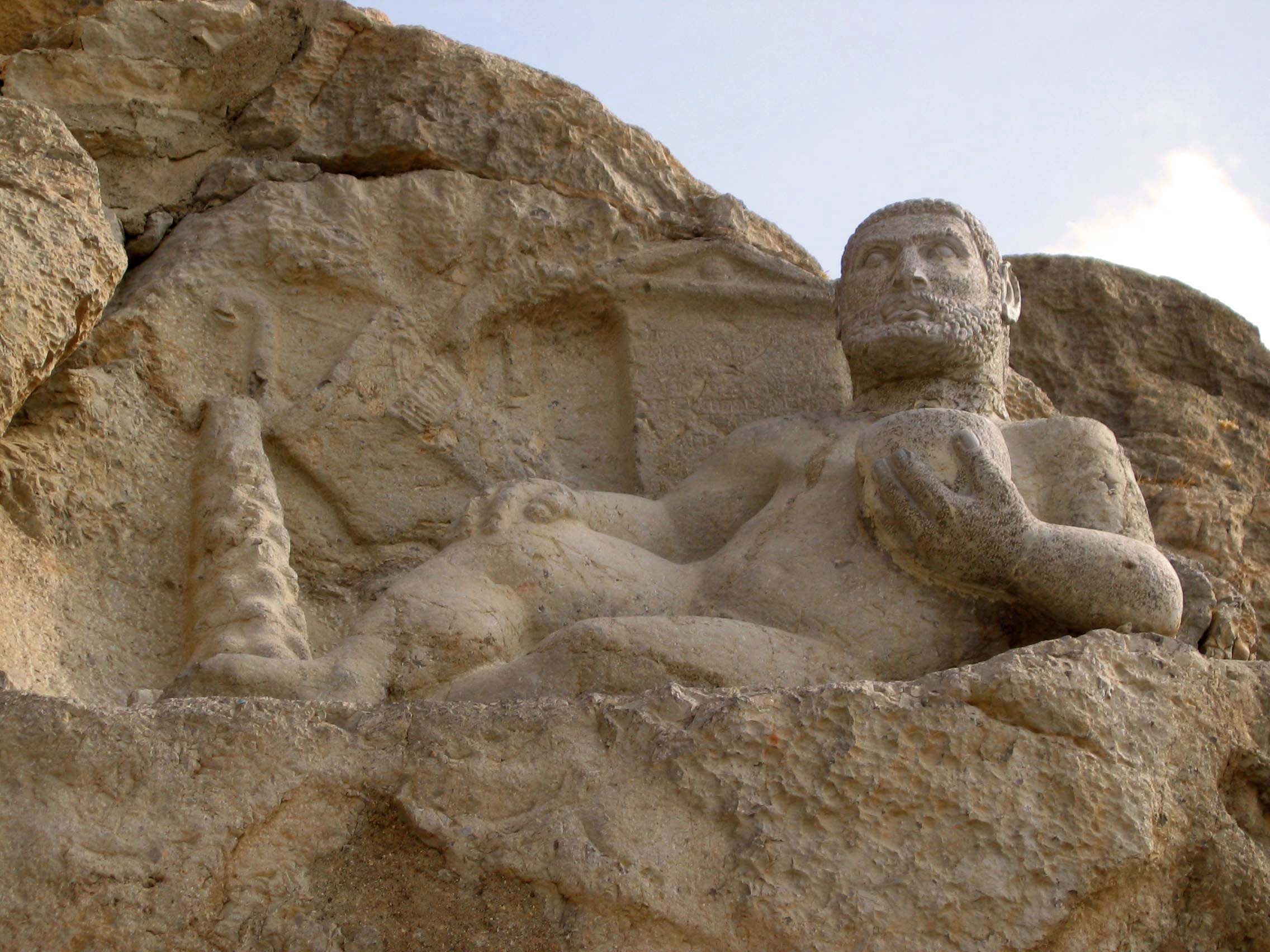
Hellenistic-era depiction of Bahram as Hercules carved in 153 BC

== Demographics ==
=== Population ===
At the time of the 2006 census, the city's population was 784,602 in 202,588 households. The following census in 2011 counted 851,405 people in 242,311 households. The last census measured the population of the city as 946,651 in 2016 and the 2025 estimate is around 1,117,000.

=== Language ===
The languages in Kermanshah are Southern Kurdish and Persian. The Kurdish language spoken in the city is called Kermashani, which is a variety of Southern Kurdish. People in the city speak Kermanshahi Persian, a local dialect which differs from standard Persian. The city has the largest Kurdish population in Iran. The predominance of Kurdish in the city has been the subject of several sociolinguistic studies documenting ongoing language maintenance and strong intergenerational transmission of the Kermashani dialect alongside bilingualism in Persian. Recent studies show the Persian dominance on Kurdish in all different social contexts, including family, friendship, neighborhood, business, education, and office contexts in the city. The Encyclopaedia Iranica characterises Kermashani as the primary vernacular of the city and situates it within the broader continuum of Southern Kurdish dialects spoken across the Zagros region.

=== Religion ===
Most of the inhabitants of Kermanshah are Shia Muslims, but there are also Sunni Muslims, Christians, and followers of Yarsanism.

== Climate ==
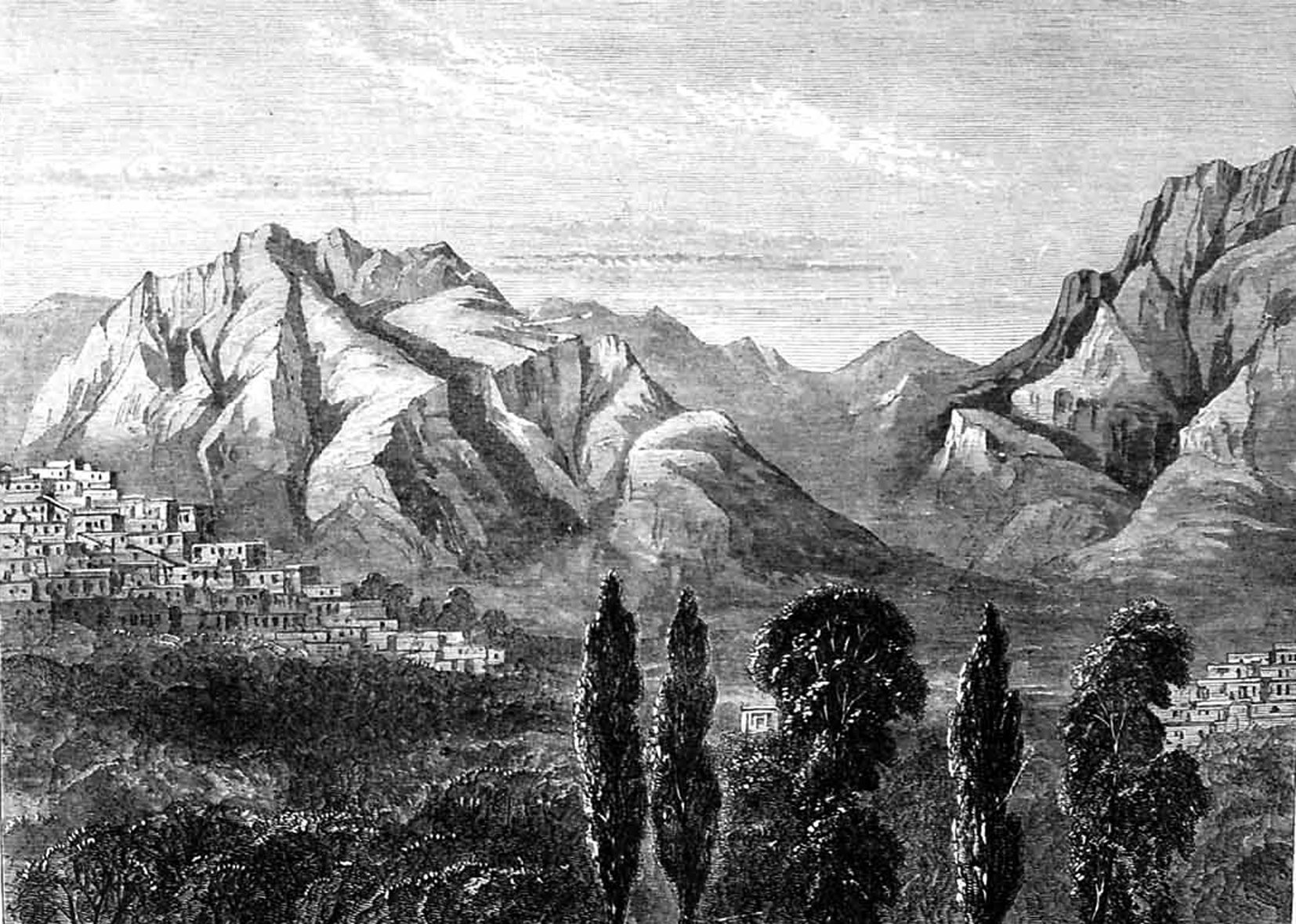
An 1866 view of Kermanshah towards the south, Farokhshad Mt. and Wasi Mt. are visible in background

Kermanshah has a montane climate; heavily influenced by the proximity of the Zagros mountains, it is classified as a hot-summer Mediterranean climate (Köppen: Csa) or a hot-summer oceanic climate (Trewartha: Dohk). The city's altitude and exposed location relative to westerly winds makes precipitation a little bit high (more than twice that of Tehran), but at the same time produces huge diurnal temperature swings especially in the virtually rainless summers, which remain extremely hot during the day. Kermanshah experiences rather cold winters and there are usually rainfalls in fall and spring. Snow cover is seen for at least a couple of weeks in winter.

Highest recorded temperature: 44.1 °C (111.4 °F) on 13 July 1998
Lowest recorded temperature: −27.0 °C (−16.6 °F) on 6 February 1974

Climate data for Kermanshah (1991–2020, extremes 1951–2020)
Month	Jan	Feb	Mar	Apr	May	Jun	Jul	Aug	Sep	Oct	Nov	Dec	Year
Record high °C (°F)	20.2 (68.4)	21.8 (71.2)	28.4 (83.1)	33.7 (92.7)	38.5 (101.3)	43.0 (109.4)	44.1 (111.4)	44.0 (111.2)	40.4 (104.7)	34.4 (93.9)	28.4 (83.1)	25.4 (77.7)	44.1 (111.4)
Mean daily maximum °C (°F)	8.8 (47.8)	11.3 (52.3)	16.0 (60.8)	21.3 (70.3)	27.5 (81.5)	34.9 (94.8)	38.8 (101.8)	38.6 (101.5)	33.6 (92.5)	26.2 (79.2)	16.9 (62.4)	11.5 (52.7)	23.8 (74.8)
Daily mean °C (°F)	2.6 (36.7)	4.7 (40.5)	9.0 (48.2)	13.8 (56.8)	19.1 (66.4)	25.7 (78.3)	29.4 (84.9)	28.9 (84.0)	23.7 (74.7)	17.3 (63.1)	9.5 (49.1)	4.9 (40.8)	15.7 (60.3)
Mean daily minimum °C (°F)	−2.9 (26.8)	−1.5 (29.3)	2.0 (35.6)	6.1 (43.0)	9.6 (49.3)	13.9 (57.0)	17.9 (64.2)	17.4 (63.3)	12.4 (54.3)	8.3 (46.9)	2.9 (37.2)	−1.0 (30.2)	7.1 (44.8)
Record low °C (°F)	−24.0 (−11.2)	−27.0 (−16.6)	−11.3 (11.7)	−6.1 (21.0)	−1.0 (30.2)	2.0 (35.6)	8.0 (46.4)	8.0 (46.4)	1.2 (34.2)	−3.5 (25.7)	−17.0 (1.4)	−17.0 (1.4)	−27.0 (−16.6)
Average precipitation mm (inches)	57.1 (2.25)	56.0 (2.20)	68.4 (2.69)	59.0 (2.32)	25.5 (1.00)	1.0 (0.04)	0.9 (0.04)	0.3 (0.01)	2.6 (0.10)	32.9 (1.30)	61.1 (2.41)	51.6 (2.03)	416.4 (16.39)
Average precipitation days (≥ 1.0 mm)	7.7	7.2	7.6	7.4	4	0.3	0.2	0.1	0.3	3	5.7	6.6	50.1
Average rainy days	7.9	8.8	9.5	9.9	5.3	0.5	0.3	0.2	0.6	5.2	9.1	9	66.3
Average snowy days	5.4	4.0	1.8	0.2	0.0	0.0	0.0	0.0	0.0	0.0	0.3	2.6	14.3
Average relative humidity (%)	68	61	54	52	43	23	19	18	21	35	56	66	43
Average dew point °C (°F)	−3.7 (25.3)	−3.3 (26.1)	−1.5 (29.3)	2.5 (36.5)	3.8 (38.8)	0.8 (33.4)	1.4 (34.5)	0.5 (32.9)	−2.0 (28.4)	−0.8 (30.6)	−0.3 (31.5)	−2.0 (28.4)	−0.4 (31.3)
Mean monthly sunshine hours	154	160	198	216	272	339	341	338	303	245	186	158	2,910
Source 1: NCEI
Source 2: Iran Meteorological Organization (snow/sleet days 1951-2010, records)

Climate data for Kermanshah
Month	Jan	Feb	Mar	Apr	May	Jun	Jul	Aug	Sep	Oct	Nov	Dec	Year
No. of days with Visibility ≤ 2 km (1.2 miles)	5.4	3.6	1.6	1.0	1.0	0.8	0.7	0.3	0.3	0.3	1.5	3.6	19.1
Mean number of days with Thunderstorm	0.9	1.0	2.2	4.6	3.9	0.7	0.2	0.2	0.5	2.1	2.0	1.0	19.3
Mean number of days with Dust	0.2	0.8	2.3	3.5	4.7	4.5	5.6	4.1	2.7	1.7	0.7	0.3	31.1

== Main sights ==
Kermanshah sights include Kohneh Bridge, Behistun Inscription, Taq-e Bostan, Temple of Anahita, Dinavar, Ganj Dareh, Essaqwand Rock Tombs, Sorkh Deh chamber tomb, Malek Tomb, Hulwan, Median dakhmeh (Darbad, Sahneh), Parav cave, Do-Ashkaft Cave, Takyeh Moaven-ol-Molk, Dokan Davood Inscription, Sarpol-e Zahab, Taq-e Gara, Sarab-e Nilufar, Quri Qala Cave, Statue of Hercules in Behistun, Emad o dolah Mosque, Jameh Mosque of Kermanshah, Godin Tepe, Behistun Inscription#Other historical monuments in the Behistun complex, and Anubanini rock relief.

=== Taq-e Bostan ===
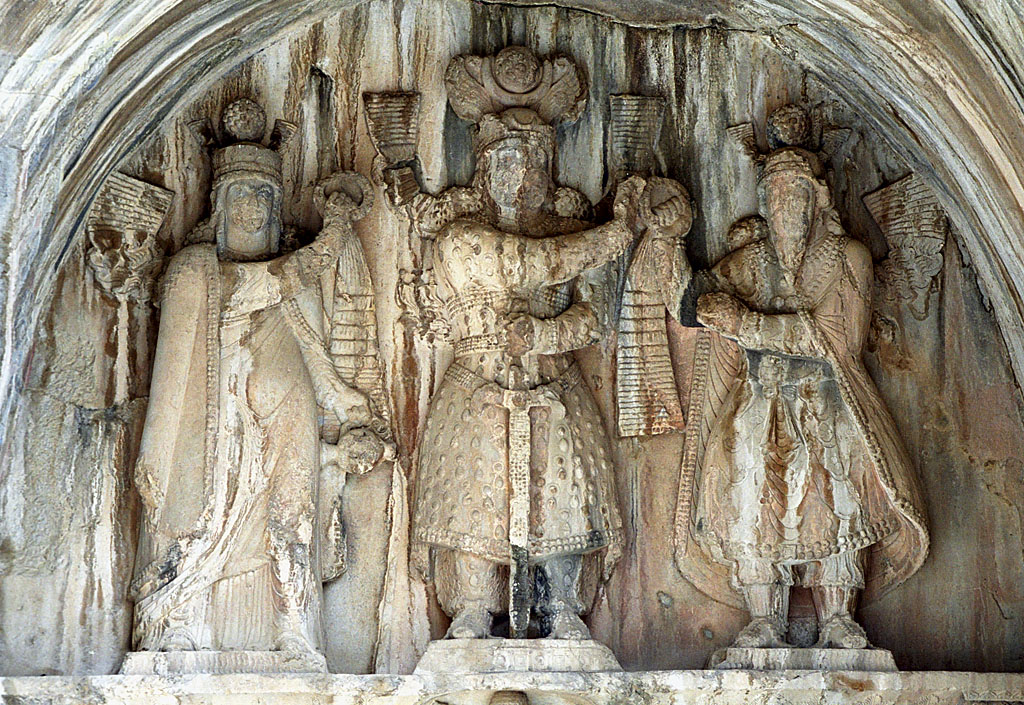
Anahita on the left as the patron yazata of the Sasanian dynasty behind Emperor Khosrow II with Ahura Mazda presenting the diadem of sovereignty on the right. Taq-e Bostan.

Taq-e Bostan is a series of large rock reliefs dating to the Sasanian era (224–651 AD). This example of Sasanian art is located 5 km (3 mi) from the city center of Kermanshah in western Iran. It is located in the heart of the Zagros mountains, where it has endured almost 1,700 years of wind and rain.

The carvings, examples of Persian sculpture under the Sasanians, include representations of the investitures of Ardashir II (r. 379–383) and Shapur III (r. 383–388). Like other Sasanian symbols, Taq-e Bostan and its relief patterns accentuate power, religious tendencies, glory, honor, the vastness of the court, game and fighting spirit, festivity, joy, and rejoicing.

Sasanian kings chose a beautiful setting for their rock reliefs along an historic Silk Road caravan route waypoint and campground. The reliefs are adjacent a sacred spring that empties into a reflecting pool at the base of a mountain cliff.

Taq-e Bostan and its rock relief are one of the 30 surviving Sasanian relics of the Zagros Mountains. According to Arthur Pope, the founder of Iranian art and archeology Institute in the US, "art was characteristic of the Iranian people and the gift which they endowed the world with."

One of the most impressive reliefs inside the largest grotto or ivan is the equestrian figure of the Sasanian king Khosrow II (r. 590–628 AD) mounted on his charger, Shabdiz. Both horse and rider are arrayed in full battle armor. The arch rests on two columns that bear delicately carved patterns showing the tree of life or the sacred tree. Above the arch and located on two opposite sides are figures of two winged angels with diadems. A noticeable border with flower patterns has been intricately carved around the outer layer of the arch. These same patterns can be seen on the official costumes of Sasanian kings. Equestrian relief panel measured on 16.08.07 approx. 7.45 m across by 4.25 m high.

=== Behistun ===
The Behistun inscription is considered as a UNESCO World Heritage Site. The Behistun Inscription (also Bisitun or Bisutun, Modern Persian: بیستون; Old Persian: Bagastana, meaning "the god's place or land") is a multi-lingual inscription located on Mount Behistun.

The inscription includes three versions of the same text, written in three different cuneiform script languages: Old Persian, Elamite, and Babylonian. A British army officer, Henry Rawlinson, had the inscription transcribed in two parts, in 1835 and 1843. Rawlinson was able to translate the Old Persian cuneiform text in 1838, and the Elamite and Babylonian texts were translated by Rawlinson and others after 1843. Babylonian was a later form of Akkadian: both are Semitic languages. In effect, then, the inscription is to cuneiform what the Rosetta Stone is to Egyptian hieroglyphs: the document most crucial in the decipherment of a previously lost script.

The inscription is approximately 15 metres high by 25 meters wide, and 100 meters up a limestone cliff from an ancient road connecting the capitals of Babylonia and Media (Babylon and Ecbatana). It is extremely inaccessible as the mountainside was removed to make the inscription more visible after its completion. The Old Persian text contains 414 lines in five columns; the Elamite text includes 593 lines in eight columns and the Babylonian text is in 112 lines. The inscription was illustrated by a life-sized bas-relief of Darius, holding a bow as a sign of kingship, with his left foot on the chest of a figure lying on his back before him. The prostrate figure is reputed to be the pretender Gaumata. Darius is attended to the left by two servants, and ten one-metre figures stand to the right, with hands tied and rope around their necks, representing conquered peoples. Faravahar floats above, giving his blessing to the king. One figure appears to have been added after the others were completed, as was (oddly enough) Darius' beard, which is a separate block of stone attached with iron pins and lead.

=== Qajar era monuments ===
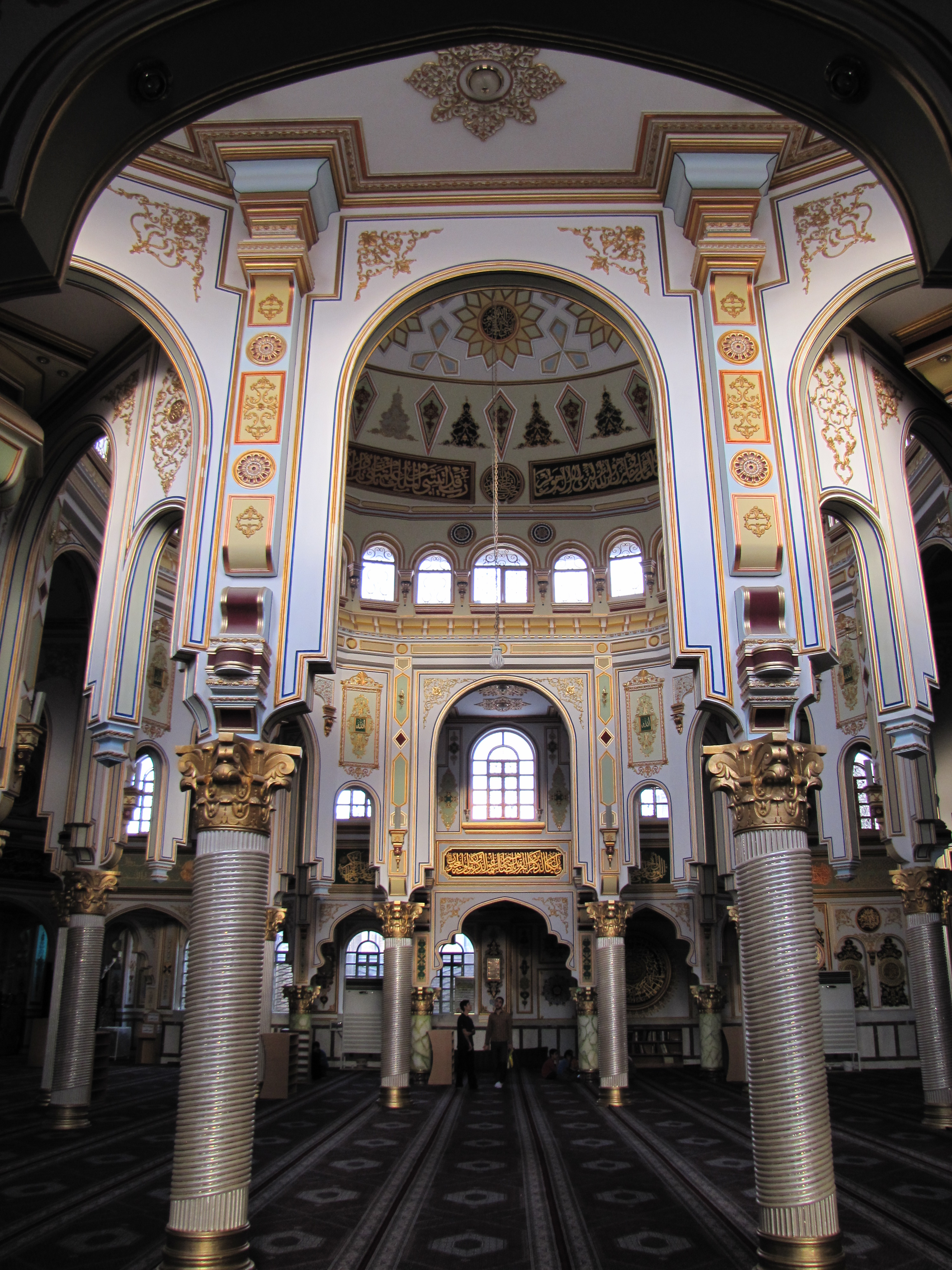
Jame-Shafeie Mosque

During the Qajar era (1789–1925), Kermanshah Bazaar, mosques and tekyehs such as Takyeh Beyglarbeygi and Takyeh Moaven-ol-Molk, and houses such as Khajeh Barookh's House were built. Takyeh Beyglarbeygi was built during the Qajar era by the efforts of Abdollah khan Beyglarbeygi and is known for its ayeneh-kari. Tekyeh Moaven-ol-Molk has pictures on the walls that relate to shahnameh, despite some of its more religious ones.

Khajeh Barookh's House is located in the old district of Faizabad, a Jewish neighborhood of the city. It was built by a Jewish merchant of the Qajar era, named Barookh/Baruch. The house, a historical depiction of Iranian architecture, was renamed "Randeh-Kesh House", after the last owner, is a "daroongara" (inward oriented) house and is connected through a vestibule to the exterior yard and through a corridor to the interior yard. Surrounding the interior yard are rooms, brick pillars making the iwans (porches) of the house, and step-like column capitals decorated with brick-stalactite work. This house is among the rare Qajar houses with a private bathroom.

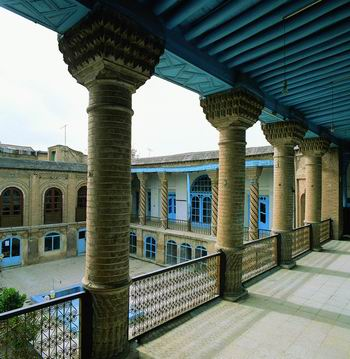
Khajeh Barookh's House

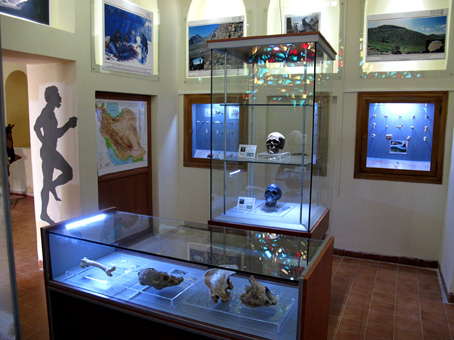
Interior of the second room of Zagros Paleolithic Museum.

=== Bazaars ===
Kermanshah is home to at least one bazaar dating back to the Qajar era. Kermanshah Grand Bazaar or Tarike Bazaar was built around 1820 when Prince Mohammad Ali Mirza Dowlatshah of the Qajar dynasty governed Kermanshah and was the largest covered bazaar of the Middle East at the time.

=== Churches ===
- Sacred Heart of Jesus Church

=== Higher education ===
More than 49 thousands students are educating in 9 governmental and private universities in the city. Established in 1968 as the Kermanshah Graduate School of Nursing, the Kermanshah University of Medical Sciences was the first university in the west part of Iran. The medical school as a division of Razi University was established in 1976 and admitted some students in general practice. Razi University established in 1972 was the second university in the west part of Iran and is the most-prominent higher education institute in Kermanshah province and also west part of the country. In 2020, Razi University ranked 24th in Iran and 1300th in the world by the U.S. News in universities of all countries of the world based upon 13 factors.

Some of Kermanshah universities are:

- Islamic Azad University of Kermanshah
- Kermanshah University of Medical Sciences
- Kermanshah University of Technology
- Payame Noor University
- Razi University

=== Schools ===
Mohtashamiyeh (Persian: محتشمیه), established in 1899, was the first modern school in Kermanshah founded by Husseinali-Khan Mohandes-e Guran. Khalq Study Hall (Persian: قرائتخانۀ خلق) was the first study hall in Kermanshah and also an adult school founded in 1909. Alliance Israélite school of Kermanshah founded by the Alliance Israélite Universelle in 1904. The Azodiyeh State School for Misses (Persian: مدرسه دولتی دوشیزگان عضدیه) was the first girls' school, founded in 1922. The first private school in Kermanshah was founded in 1991.

== Notable people ==
=== Arts ===
- Ali Mohammad Afghani, novelist
- Seyed Khalil Alinezhad, Tanbour master
- Mahshid Amirshahi, writer
- Nozar Azadi, actor
- Ali Ashraf Darvishian, novelist and writer
- Pouran Derakhshandeh, film director, producer, screenwriter
- Reza Shafiei Jam, actor
- Mirza Mohammad Reza Kalhor, calligrapher
- Mir Jalaleddin Kazzazi, writer
- Rahim Moeini Kermanshahi, poet, lyricist
- Alexis Kouros, writer, documentary-maker, director, and producer
- Abolghasem Lahouti, poet
- Doris Lessing, writer, 2007 winner of the Nobel Prize in Literature (born in Kermanshah to British parents)
- Aref Lorestani, actor, comedian
- Shahram Mokri, film director
- Nicky Nodjoumi, modern painter
- Reza Fieze Norouzi, actor
- Guity Novin, painter & graphic designer
- Mohammad Salemy, artist, curator, writer
- Gholamreza Rashid-Yasemi, one of the Five-Masters of Persian Literature

=== Music ===
- Evin Agassi, singer
- Kayhan Kalhor, musician
- Mojtaba Mirzadeh, master of violin and setar
- Roknoddin Mokhtari, violin player
- Ali Akbar Moradi, musician and tanbour player
- Shahram Nazeri, vocalist and musician
- Sohrab Pournazeri, musician
- Susan (Golandam Taherkhani), singer
- Marganita Vogt-Khofri, pianist, classical musician, and vocalist
- Bahramji, musician and santur player

=== Politics and military ===
- Ebrahim Azizi, member and spokesman of the Guardian Council
- Abdol Ali Badrei, commander of the Imperial Iranian Army and the Imperial Guard
- Amir Hossein Rabii, commander of the Imperial Iranian Air Force
- Joanna Palani, Kurdish sabotage and sniper.
- Hanif Bali, member of Swedish Riksdag
- Karim Sanjabi, Iran's attorney during oil nationalization movement, former foreign minister
- Bijan Namdar Zangeneh, minister of Petroleum
- Yar Mohammadkhan Kermanshahi, a pivotal figure in the Iranian Constitutional Revolution

=== Sciences ===
- Shahram Amiri, nuclear scientist
- Massoud Azarnoush, archaeologist
- Al-Dinawari, botanist, historian, geographer, astronomer and mathematician
- Fereidoun Biglari, archaeologist

=== Sports ===
- Makwan Amirkhani, mixed martial artist, UFC fighter
- Kourosh Bagheri, world weightlifting champion
- Homa Hosseini, rower
- Ali Mazaheri, 2006 Asian Games gold medalist, Asian champion & Olympic boxer
- Mohammad Hassan Mohebbi, light heavyweight freestyle wrestler & Iran's national team coach
- Mohammad Hossein Mohebbi, freestyle wrestler
- Yadollah Mohebbi, 125 kg freestyle wrestler and nephew of Mohammad Hossein Mohebbi and Mohammad Hassan Mohebbi
- Mohammad Ranjbar, former Iran national football team player and head coach
- Kianoush Rostami, world weight lifting champion
- Neda Shahsavari, table tennis champion
- Mohammad Torkashvand, volleyball champion
- Mehran Shahintab, basketball champion & head coach of the Iranian national team Iran Basketball Federation
- Peter Warr, businessman, racing driver and a manager for several Formula One teams
- Saeid Ahmadi, world champion gold and silver medalist in karate

== Gallery ==
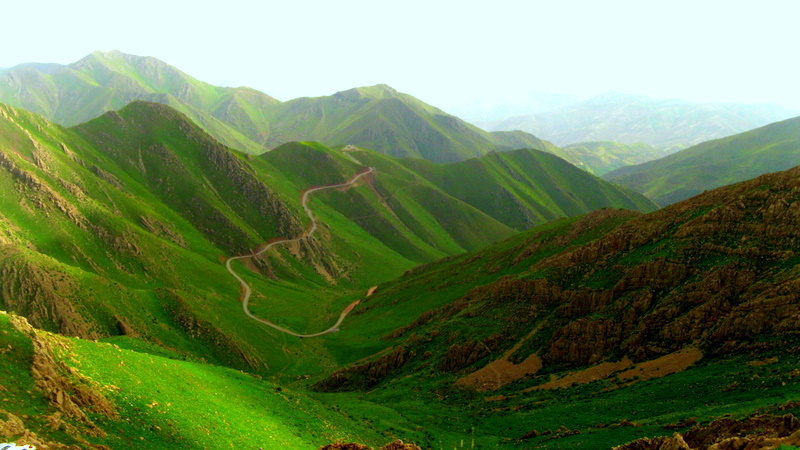

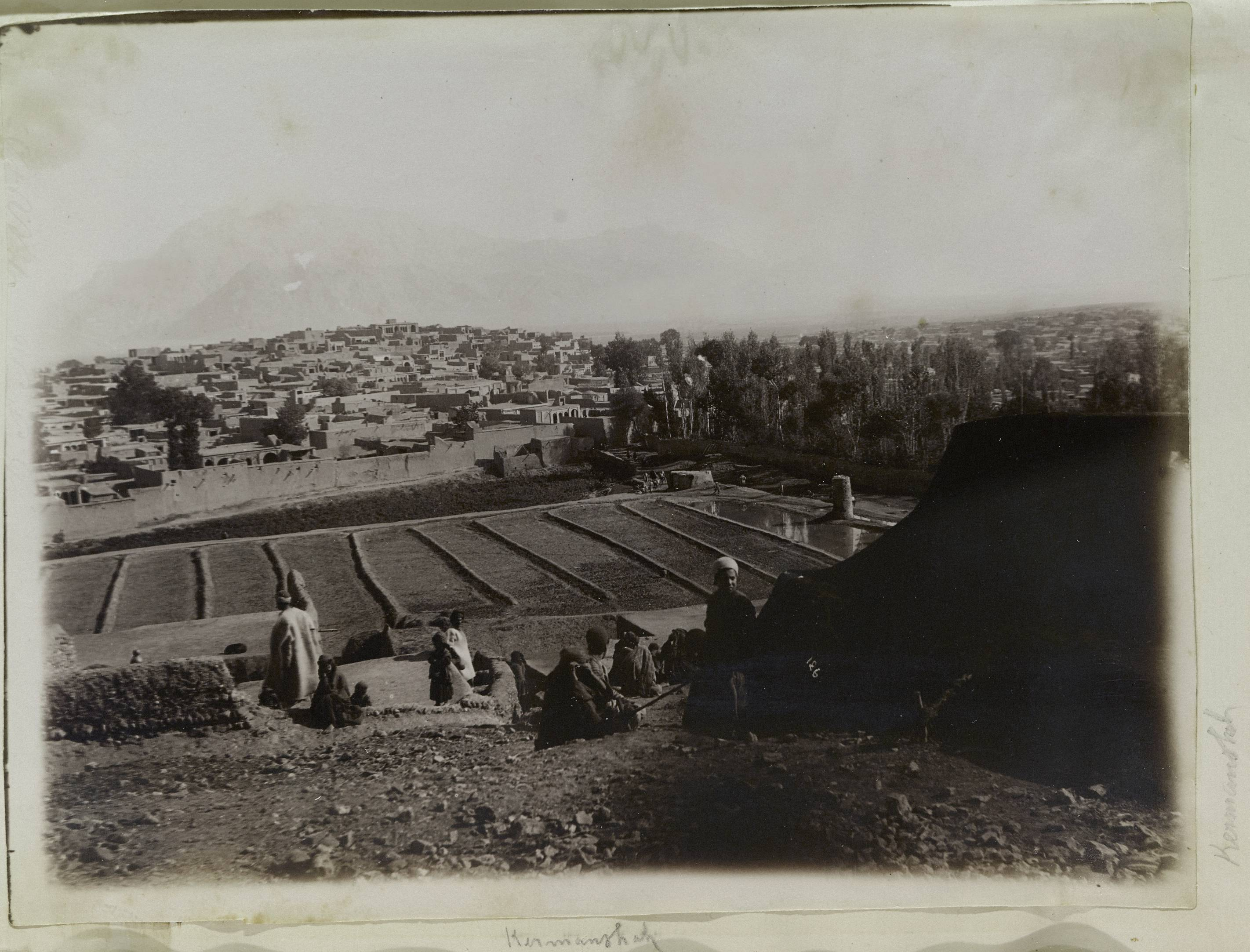
Historical panorama of Kermanshah in the late 19th century, by Antoin Sevruguin

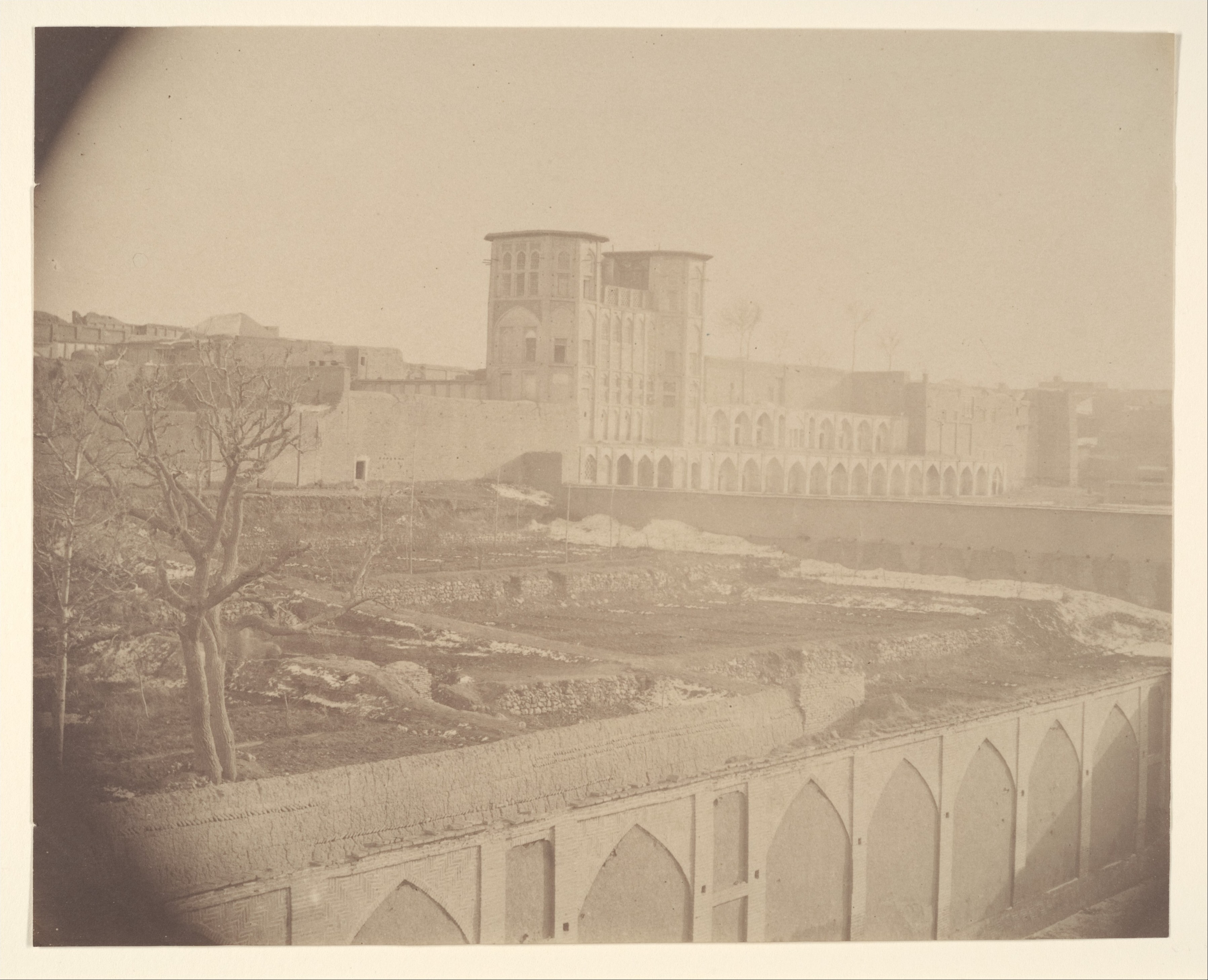
Kermanshah photographed by Luigi Pesce between 1840 and 1860

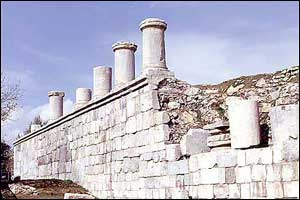
Anahita Temple in Kangavar

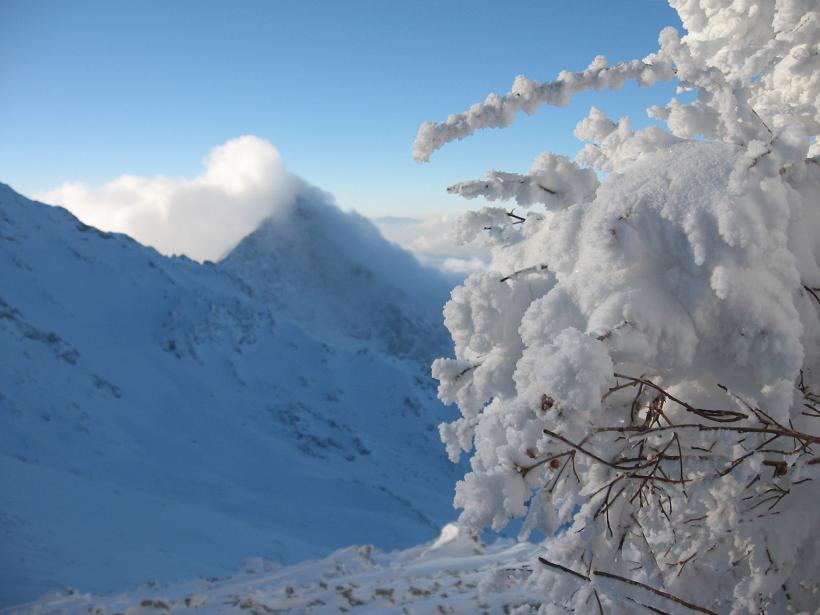
Mount Dalekhani

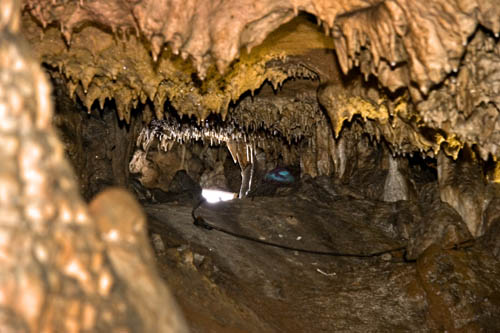
Ghouri Ghaleh Cave

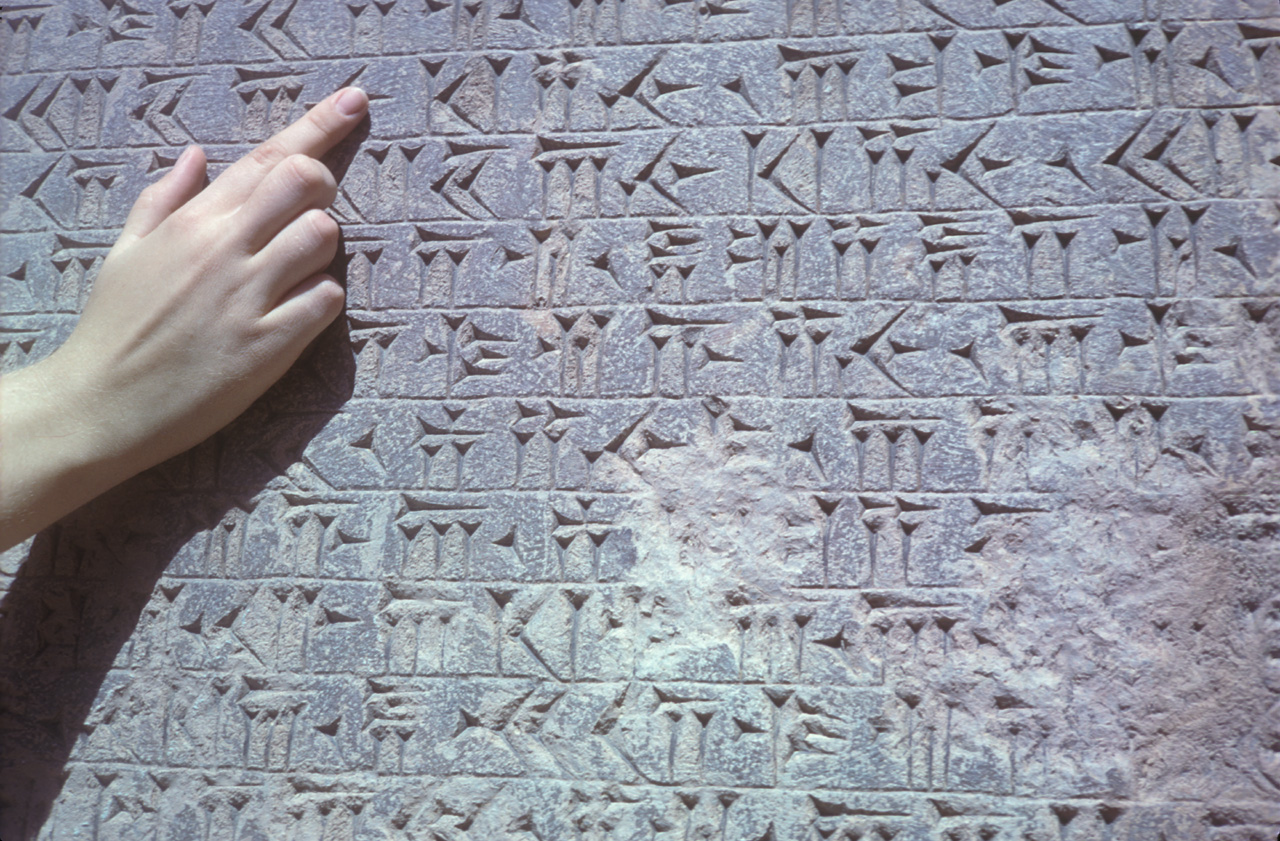
Close-Up of Bisotun Inscription

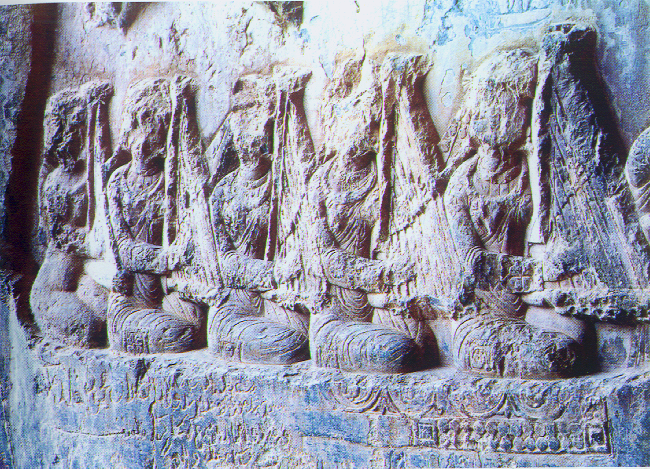
Taq-e Bostan Carving (Note: Women playing harp while the king is standing in a boat holding his bow and arrows, from 6th century Sassanid Iran)

== See also ==
- Kalhor

Kermanshah travel guide from Wikivoyage

- Media related to Kermanshah at Wikimedia Commons

== Sources ==
- Borijan, Habib (2015). "KERMANSHAH i. Geography". Encyclopaedia Iranica.
- Borijan, Habib (2016). "KERMANSHAH vii. Languages and Dialects". Encyclopaedia Iranica.
- Calmard, Jean (2015). "KERMANSHAH iv. History from the Arab Conquest to 1953". Encyclopaedia Iranica.
- Pirnazar, Nahid (2014). "KERMANSHAH viii. The Jewish Community". Encyclopaedia Iranica.
