= Hôpital de La Grave =

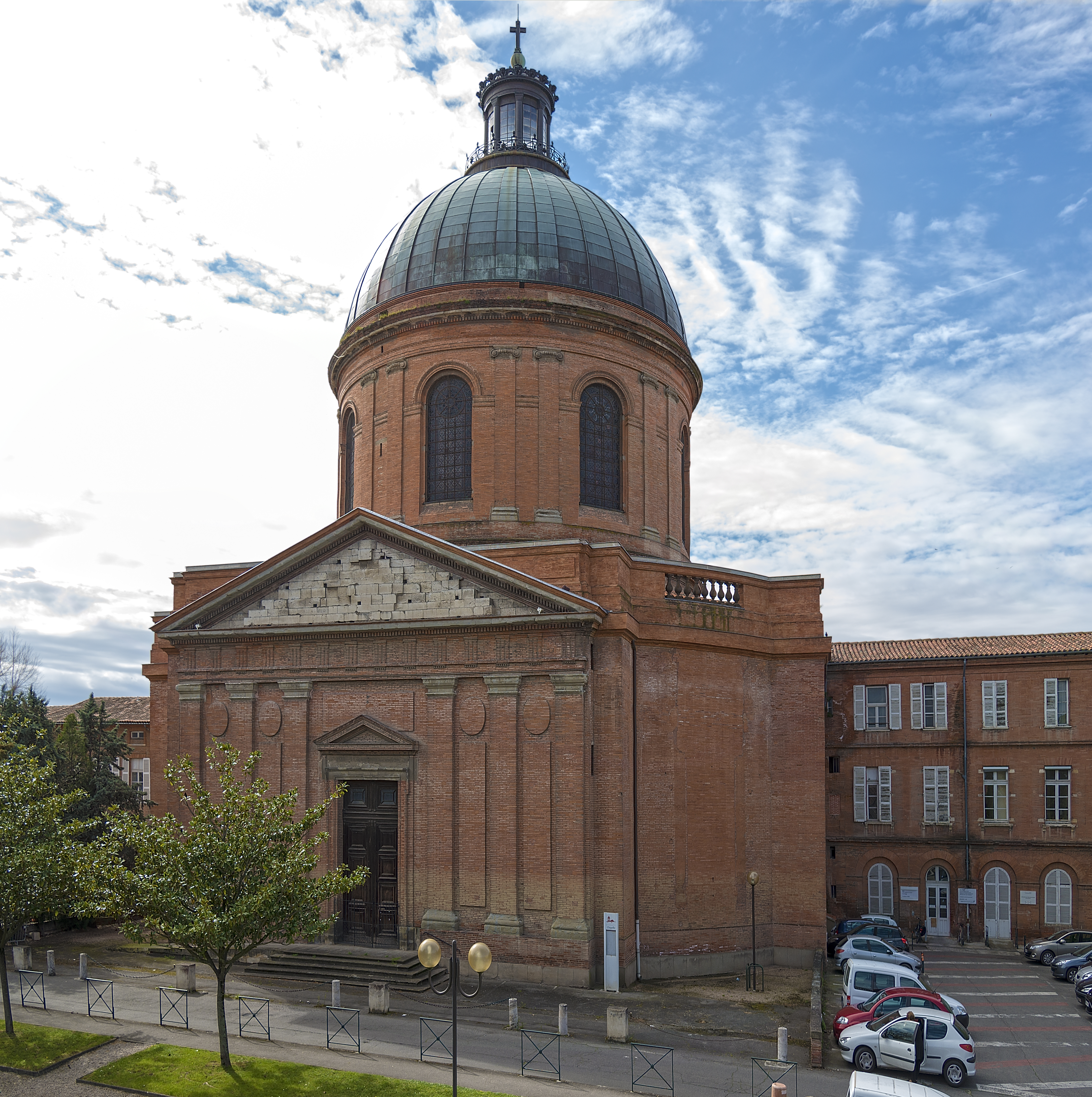
- Chapel of hôpital Saint-Joseph de la Grave

Geography
- Location: Saint-Cyprien quartier of Toulouse, France
- Coordinates: 43.600°N 1.432°E

History
- Opened: 1197

Links
- Lists: Hospitals in France

The Hôpital de La Grave (Occitan: Hospitau de La Grava) is a hospital situated in the Saint-Cyprien quartier of Toulouse in Southwest France on the left bank of the Garonne. Taking up six hectares (three times the size of the Hôtel-Dieu), La Grave was the second largest hospital establishment and primary maternal care center of Toulouse during much of the 20th century until the CHU of Rangueil was built. It is named for the sandy bank (Standard French: grève) of the Garonne where it was built.

== History ==
=== Beginnings ===
The original "Hôpital de La Grave" was first mentioned in an 1197 charter of Count Raymond IV of Toulouse. Today, nothing remains of the original hospital.

=== Plague years ===
- After the first appearance of the Black Death in Toulouse (1348-1350), the city suffered a regular recurrence of bubonic plague over the next four centuries. Following a devastating outbreak, the ancient Hôpital de La Grave was enlarged between 1508 and 1514 and adopted the name Saint-Sébastien, a saint invoked to protect against plague. During the expansion, Saint-Sébastien sheltered the plague-stricken in a pavilion enclosed by a wall, in order to separate them from other inmates: beggars, foundlings, the disabled or terminally ill, the insane and prostitutes.
- A recurrence of plague, the deadliest of the seventeenth century, struck Toulouse in 1628. The elites, including physicians, began fleeing the town. The situation deteriorated to the point that the Capitouls brought four surgeons from Cahors to assist in treating the patients. On June 17 of the next year every plague victim in the hospital died. Those in charge took advantage of the situation to disinfect the premises.

=== Rebirth ===
The hospital was transitioned into a place to confine and care for the city's poor beginning on 26 March 1647. The name was changed to Toulouse l’Hôpital Général Saint-Joseph de La Grave. A Papal Bull granted approval in 1658.

== Births ==
- Reza Ghanbari (murder victim)
