= Sacred Heart of Jesus Church, Kermanshah =

Sacred Heart of Jesus Church
- کلیسای قلب مقدس مسیح
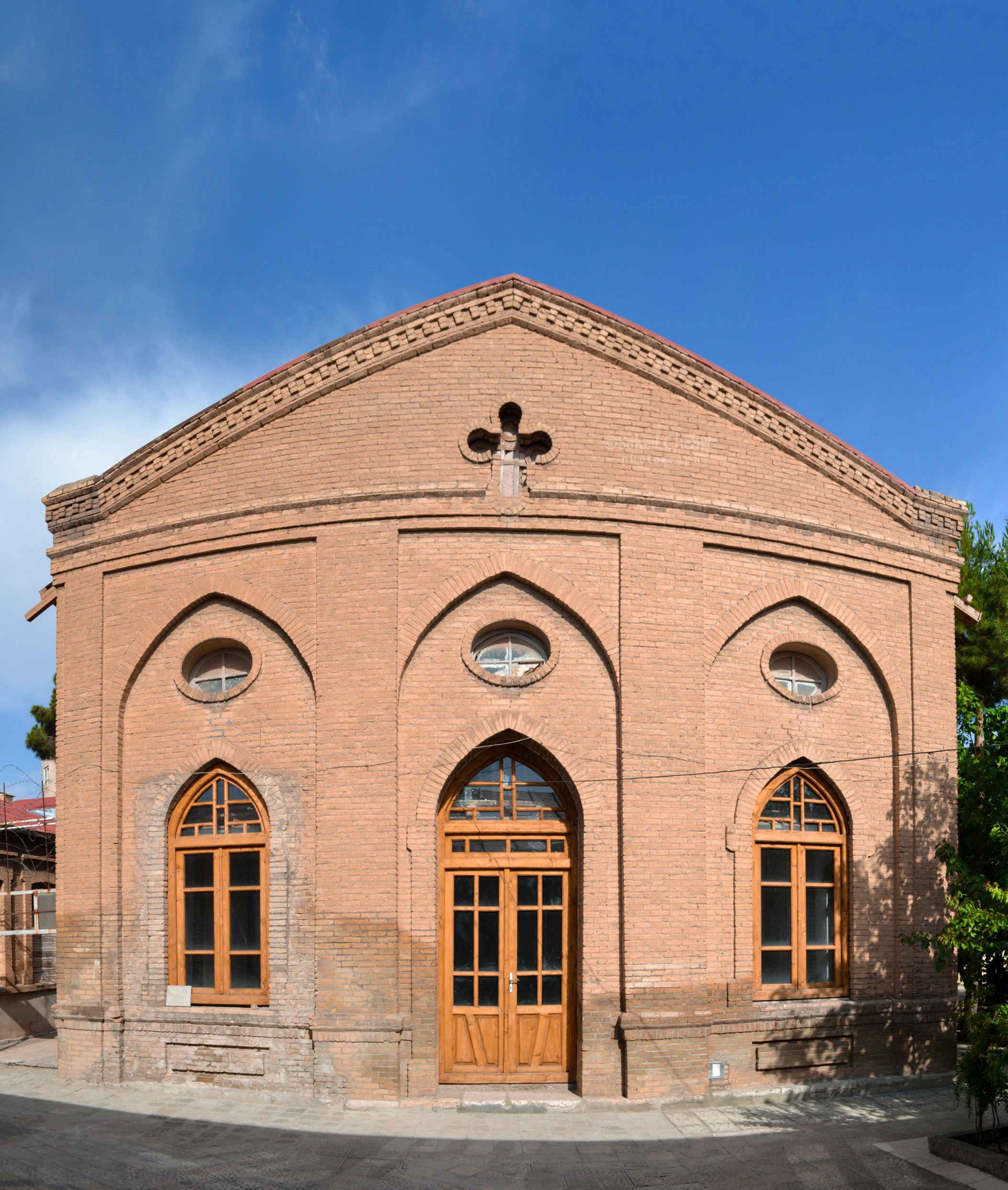
- Location: Kermanshah
- Country: Iran

History
- Consecrated: 1914

Sacred Heart of Jesus Church is a church in Kermanshah, Iran. The church was constructed in 1914 by order of Bishop Yohannanyan.

The church was registered as an Iranian national heritage site (registration number 11059) on August 7, 2004.

The church features arched doors and windows. The main facade is decorated with a Santoor which is embedded in the middle of a cross-shaped skylight.

== See also ==
- Cultural Heritage, Handicrafts and Tourism Organization of Iran
