= Jameh Mosque of Shafei =

Mosque in Kermanshah, Iran

- مسجد جامع شافعی
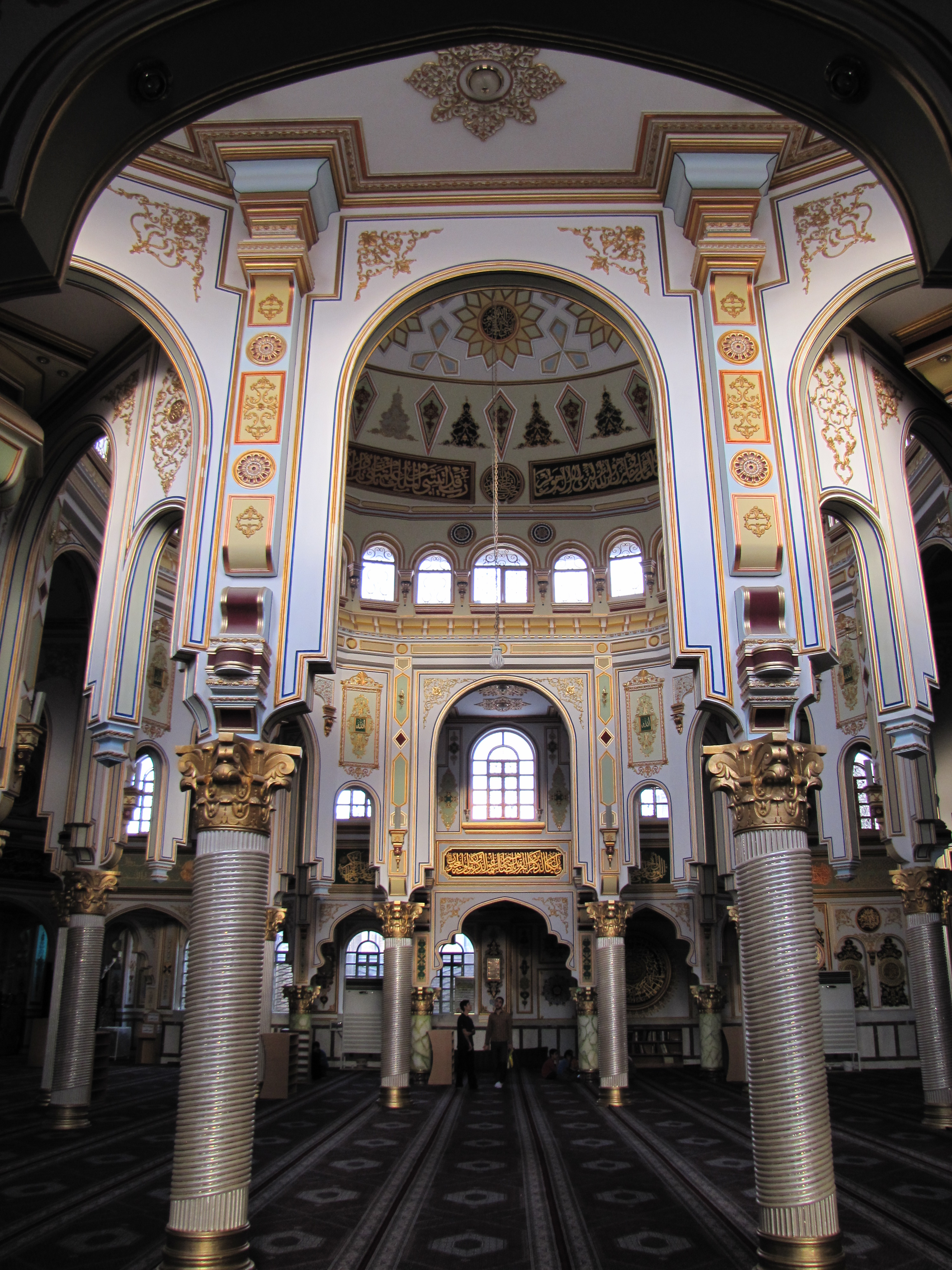
- The mosque interior in 2010

- Location of the mosque in Iran

Religion
- Affiliation: Sunni Islam
- Ecclesiastical or organizational status: Friday mosque
- Status: Active

Location
- Location: Kermanshah, Kermanshah Province
- Country: Iran
- Interactive map of Jameh Mosque of Shafei
- Coordinates: 34°19′01″N 47°04′03″E

Architecture
- Type: Mosque architecture
- Style: Ottoman
- Groundbreaking: 1911
- Completed: 1945

Specifications
- Dome: One
- Minaret: Two

The Jameh Mosque of Shafei (Persian: مسجد جامع شافعی, romanized: Shafi'i Jami Mosque; Arabic: جامع شافعي), is a Sunni Friday mosque, located near the bazaar in the city of Kermanshah, in the province of Kermanshah, Iran.

== Overview ==
The mosque leads from one side to Javanshir Square and from the other side to Tarike Bazar and was built by the Sunnis of Kermanshah in a place that used to be a place of pilgrimage. The construction of the mosque began in 1911 and was completed in 1945.

The construction of the mosque was made possible by the efforts of Khalifa Mohammad Saleh Mohammadi, Khalifa Seyed Ali Naqshbandi, Jafar Sharifi, Ahmed Modalli, Mirza Habib Blandi, Ali Mohammad Shiani, and other people from Kermanshah.

== Gallery ==
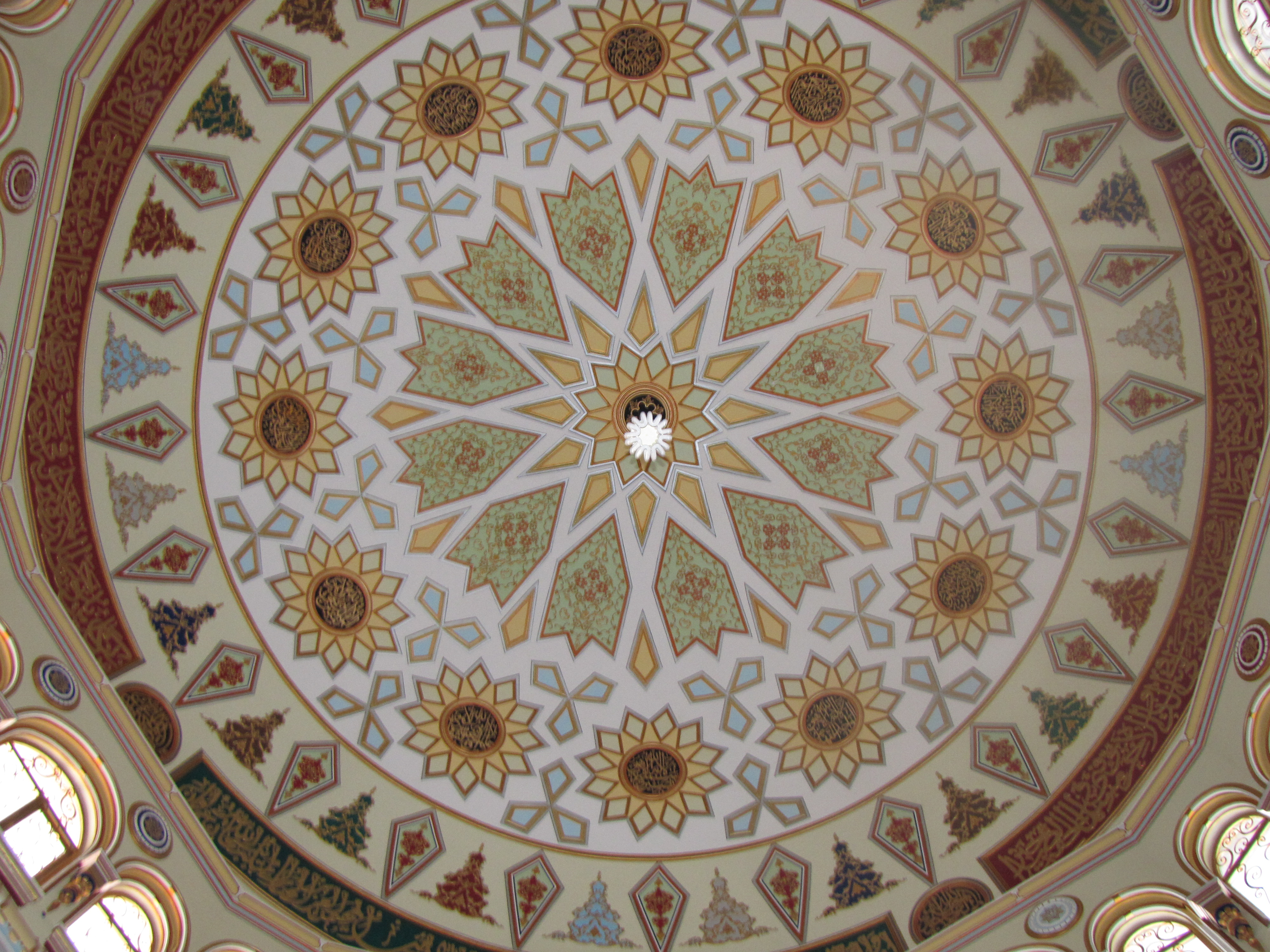
The interior of the dome

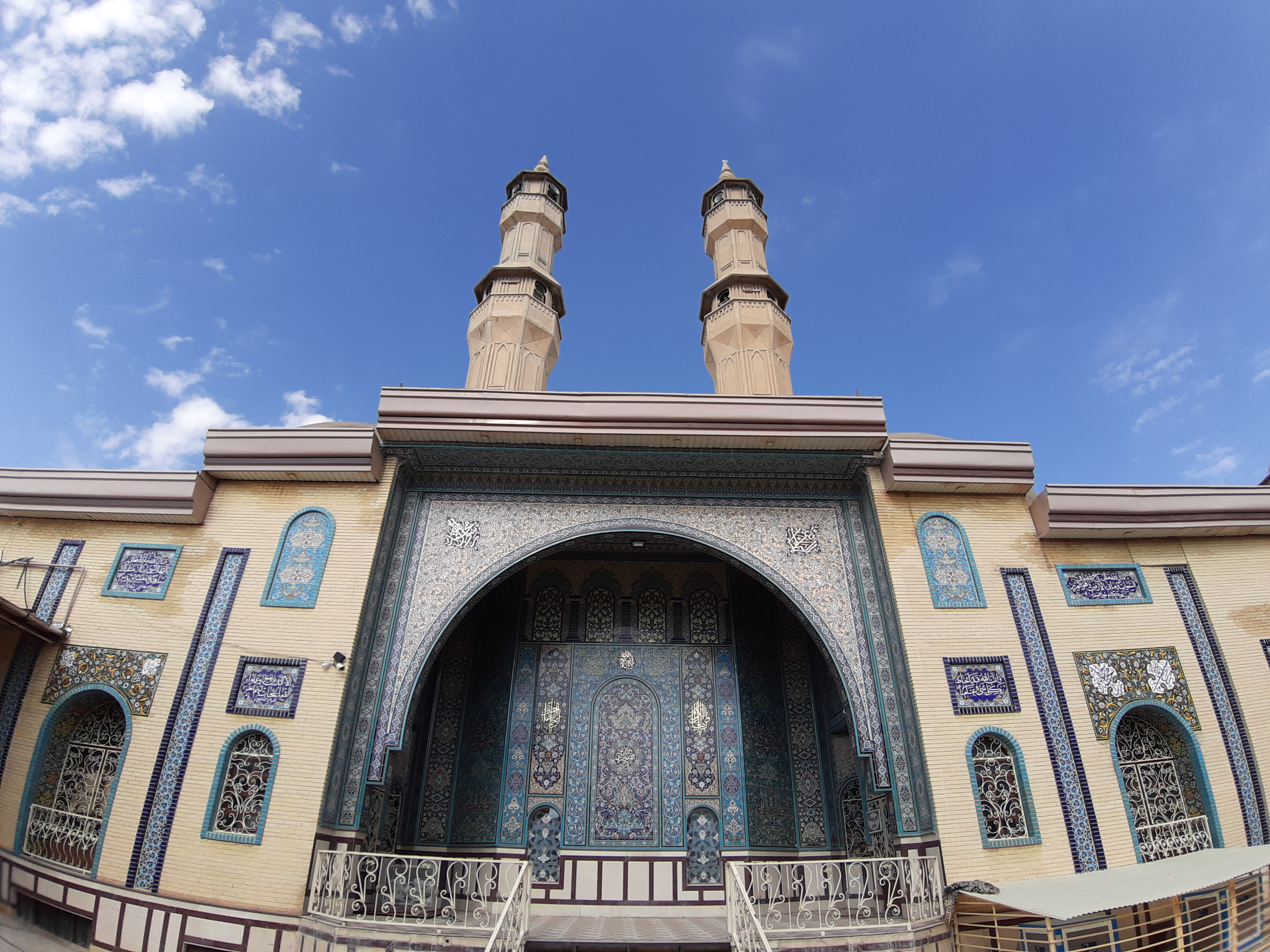
The iwan and two minarets

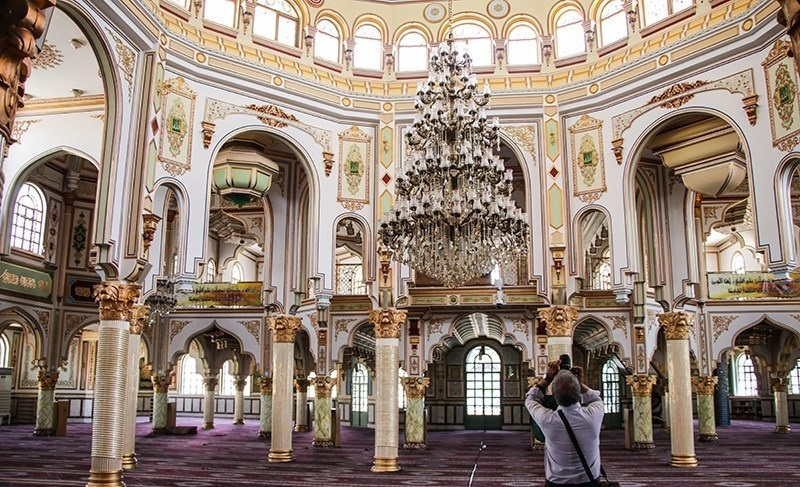
Mosque interior

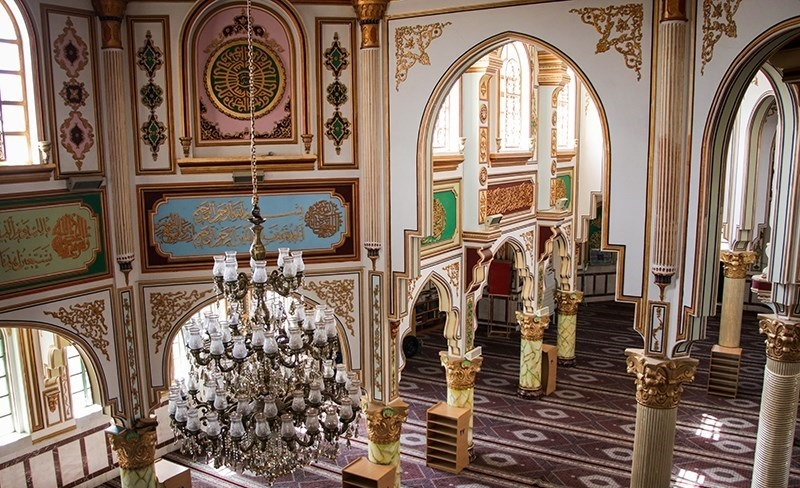
Mosque interior

== See also ==
- Sunni Islam in Iran
- List of mosques in Iran
