= Emad od-Dowleh Mosque =

Mosque in Kermanshah, Iran

- مسجد عمادالدوله
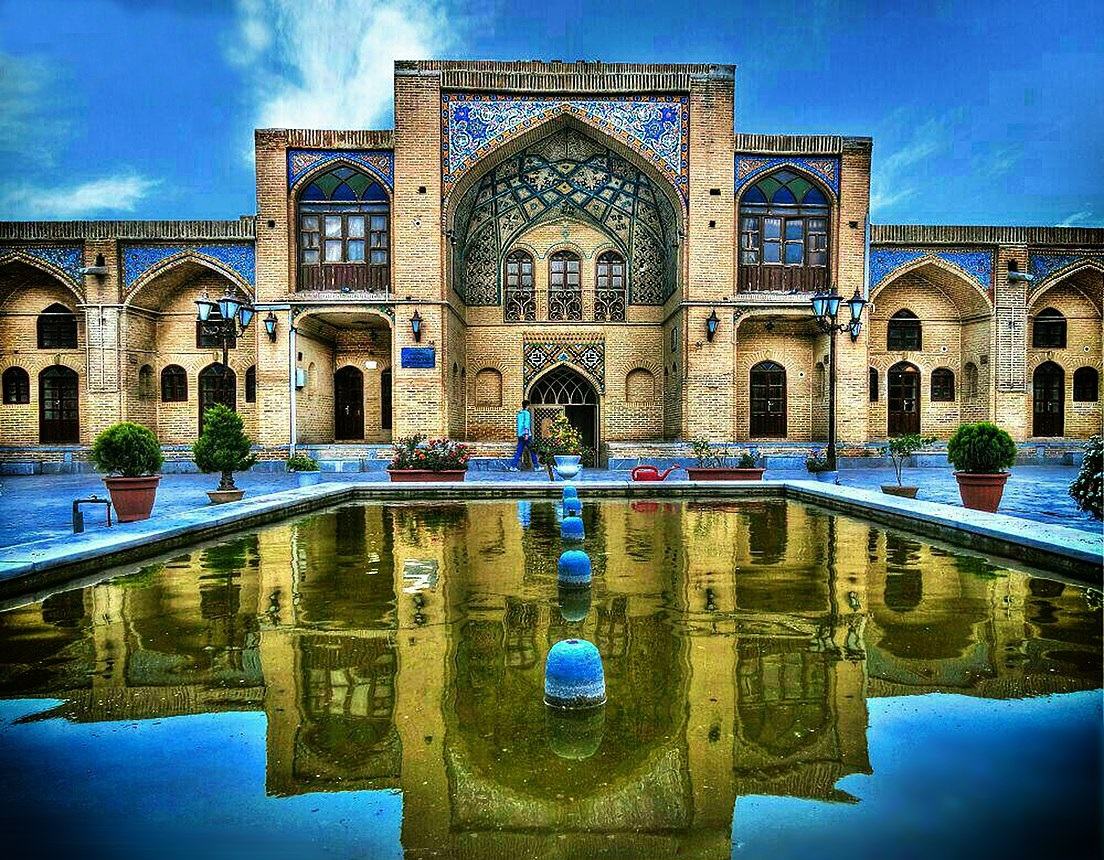

- Location within Iran

Religion
- Affiliation: Shia Islam
- Ecclesiastical or organisational status: Mosque
- Status: Active

Location
- Location: Kermanshah, Kermanshah province
- Country: Iran
- Coordinates: 34°19′03″N 47°04′12″E

Architecture
- Type: Mosque architecture
- Style: Qajar
- Completed: 1868 CE

Specifications
- Dome: One (maybe more)
- Minaret: One
- Materials: Stone; bricks; mortar

Iran National Heritage List
- Official name: Emad od-Dowleh Mosque
- Type: Built
- Designated: 2 January 2008
- Reference no.: 20490
- Conservation organization: Cultural Heritage, Handicrafts and Tourism Organization of Iran

Emad od-Dowleh Mosque (Persian: مسجد عمادالدوله, romanized: Masjed-e Emad od-Dowleh; Arabic: مسجد عماد الدولة), also spelled as the Emadodoleh Mosque, is a mosque located in the city of Kermanshah, in the province of Kermanshah, Iran. The mosque was commissioned by Emamqoli Mirza Emad od-Dowleh and was completed in 1868 CE, during the Qajar era, in the reign of Naser al-Din Shah.

The mosque has suffered damage as a result of earthquakes in the region. The square minaret is unusual in that it has a clocktower on the side facing the sahn.

The mosque was added to the Iran National Heritage List on 2 January 2008, administered by the Cultural Heritage, Handicrafts and Tourism Organization of Iran.

== Gallery ==
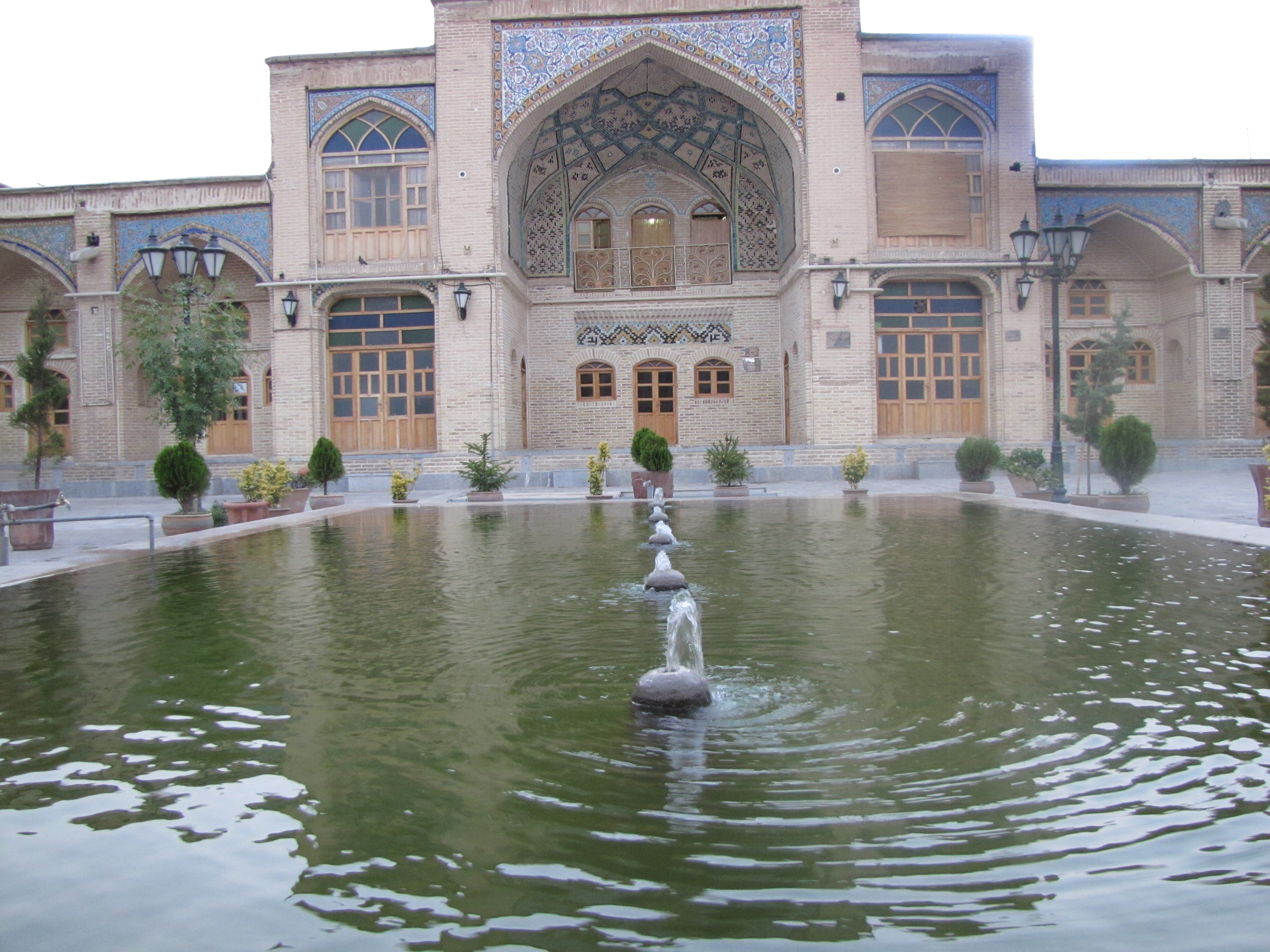
The pond and iwan, as viewed from the sahn

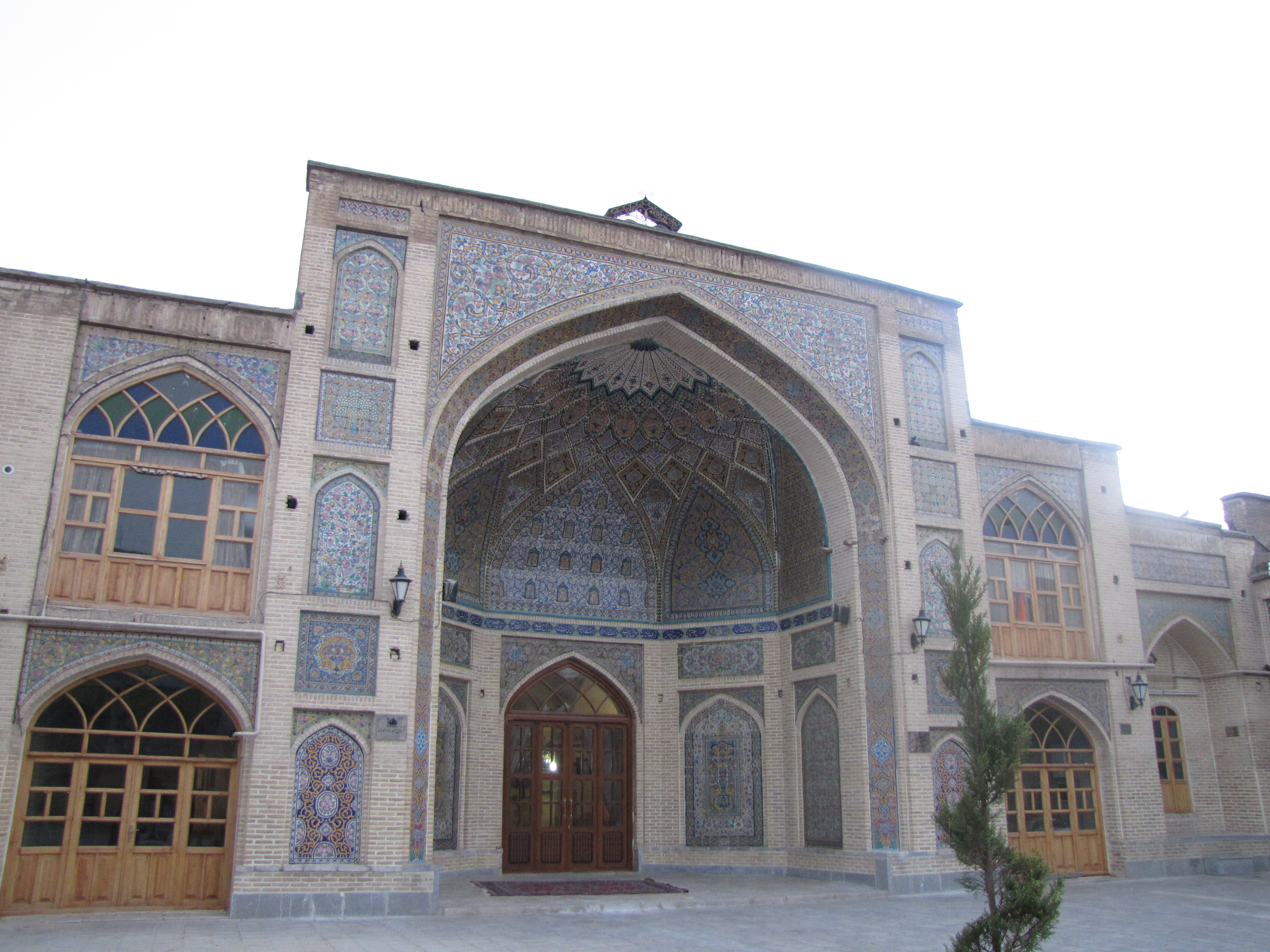
An iwan

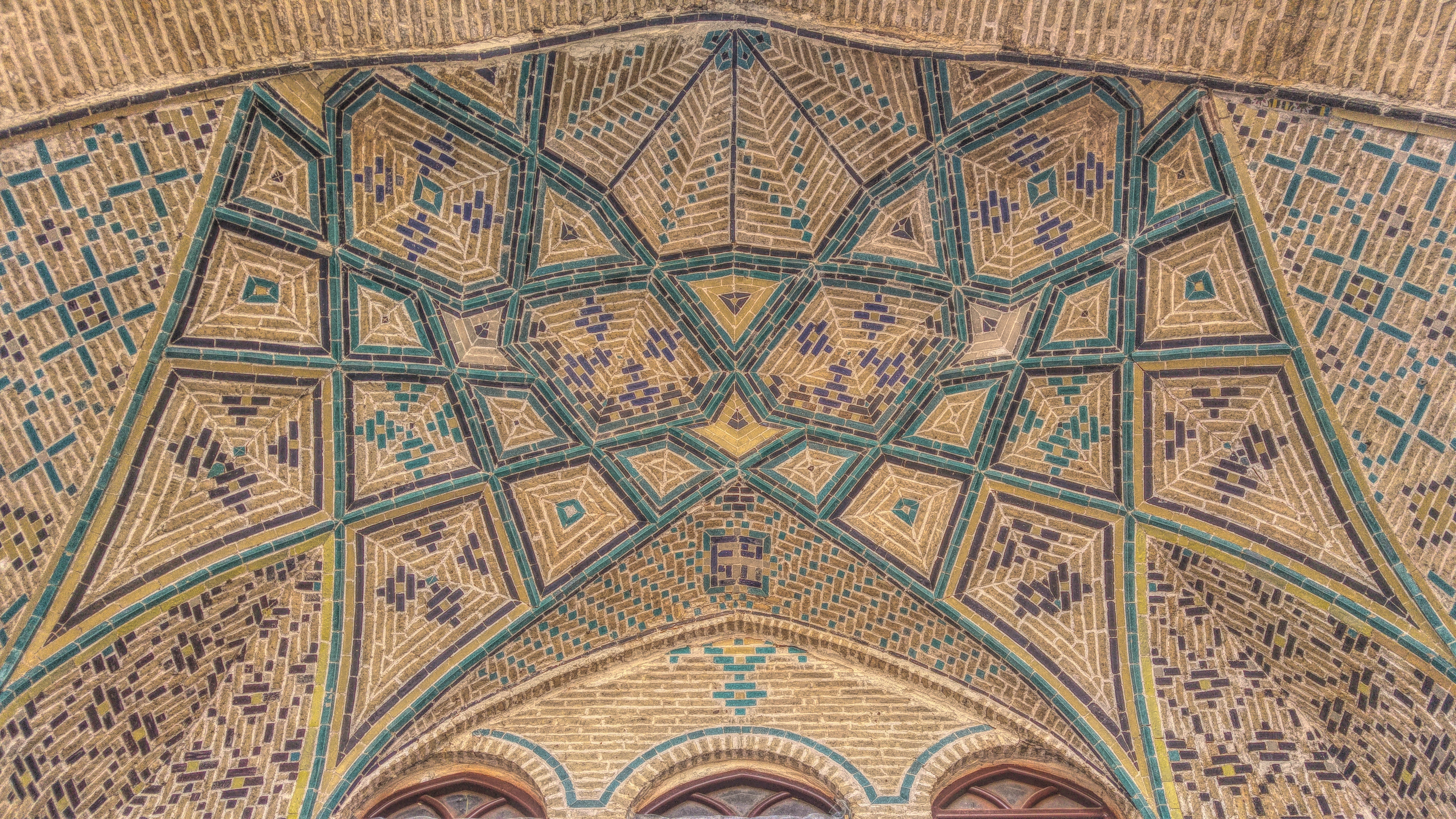
Interior of the dome

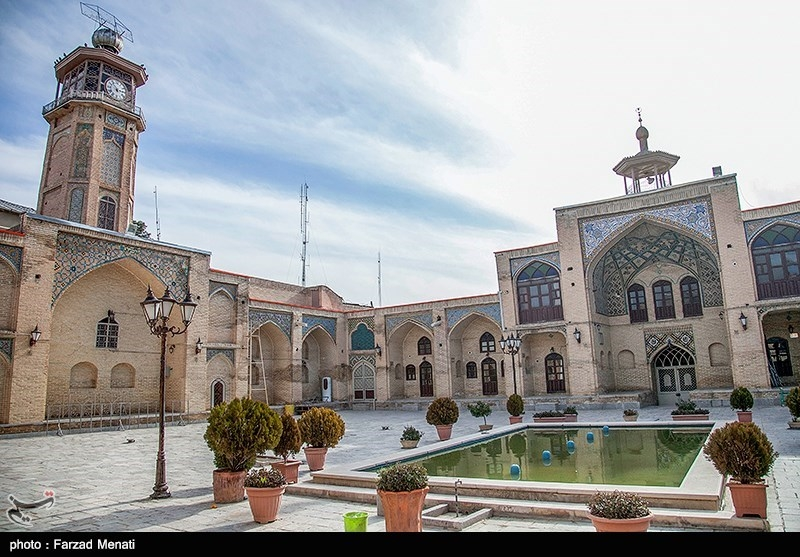
Minaret and turret on an iwan

== See also ==
- Shia Islam in Iran
- List of mosques in Iran
