= Jameh Mosque of Kermanshah =

Mosque in Kermanshah, Iran

- مسجد جامع کرمانشاه
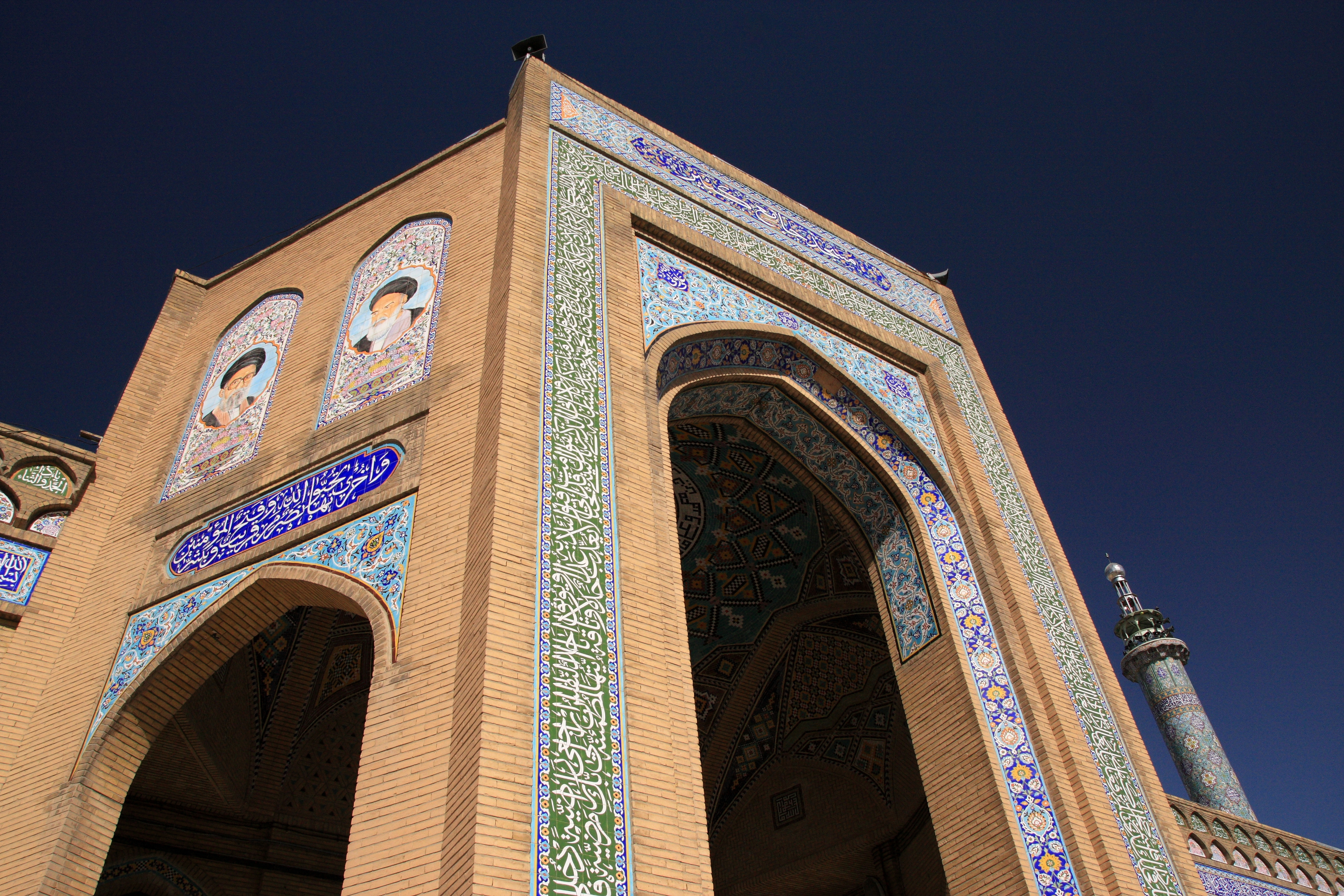
- The mosque iwan, with extensive Kufic inscriptions, in 2010

- Location of the mosque in Iran

Religion
- Affiliation: Shia Islam
- Ecclesiastical or organizational status: Friday mosque
- Status: Active

Location
- Location: Kermanshah, Kermanshah Province
- Country: Iran
- Interactive map of Jameh Mosque of Kermanshah
- Coordinates: 34°19′06″N 47°04′16″E

Architecture
- Type: Mosque architecture
- Style: Zand
- Completed: 1196 AH (1781/1782 CE)
- Dome: One (maybe more)
- Inscriptions: Two

The Jameh Mosque of Kermanshah (Persian: مسجد جامع کرمانشاه, romanized: Masjed-e Jameh; Arabic: جامع كرمانشاه), also called the Chehel Sotoun Mosque, is a Shi'ite Friday mosque, located on Modarres Street and Rashid Yasemi Street in the old city of Kermanshah, in the province of Kermanshah, Iran.

The mosque was completed in 1196 AH (1781/1782 CE), during the Zand dynasty.

== See also ==
- Shia Islam in Iran
- List of mosques in Iran
