= Takyeh Beyglarbeygi =

Historic building in Kermanshah, Iran

Coordinates: 34.313551°N 47.070376°E

Takyeh Beyglarbeygi تکیه بیگلربیگی
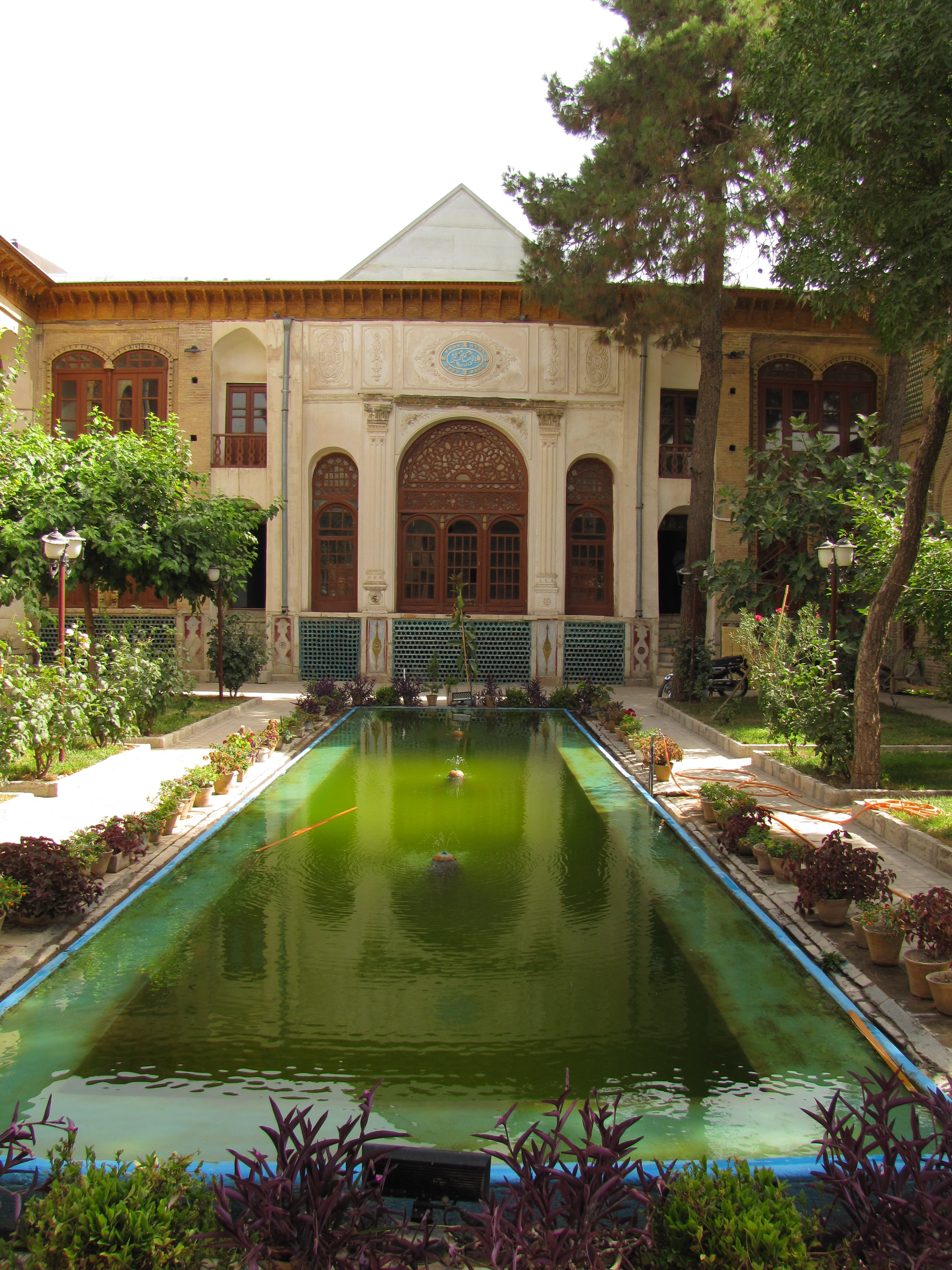

- Location in Iran
- Location: Kermanshah, Iran

History
- Built: 1891

Site notes
- Architectural style: Persian architecture

Takyeh Beyglarbeygi is a takyeh located in Kermanshah and is well known for its ayeneh-kari ornamentations. Takyeh Beyglarbeygi was constructed during the Qajar era by the efforts of Abdollah khan Biglarbeygi and bears inscriptions of Mozaffar ad-Din Shah Qajar.

It is no longer used for mourning, but it has been turned into a museum of calligraphy as well as old documents of the Biglarbeygi family. It was registered in the list of national monuments on 10 December 1996, number 1797. In 2001, it purchased its cultural heritage and was restored in 2002 and 2003, and in 2004, it was opened as a museum of calligraphy. In 2008, the Zagros Paleolithic Museum was inaugurated by the cultural heritage on the south side.

== Gallery ==
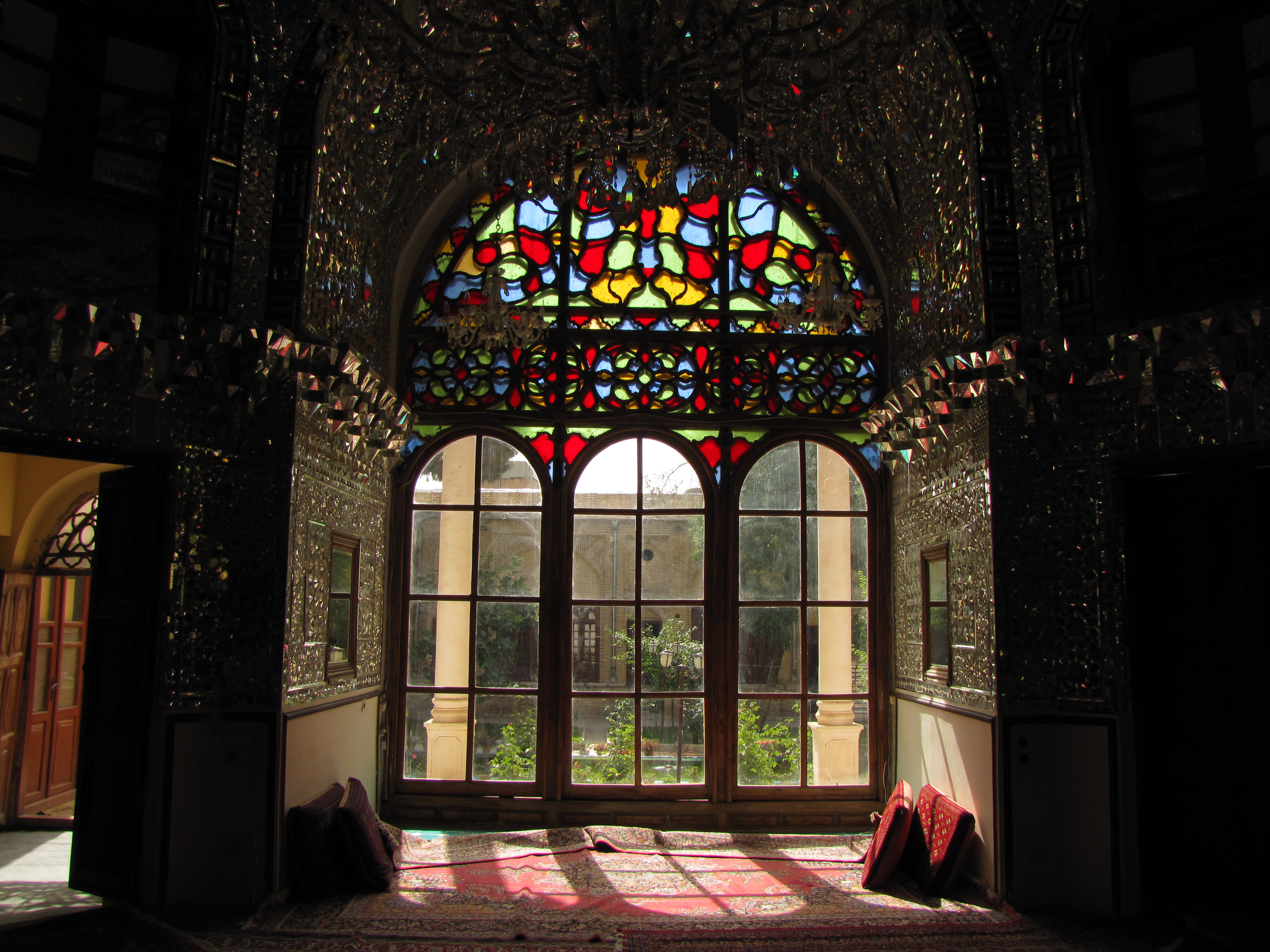
Interior of the building decorated with ayeneh-kari
