= Tappa Gawri =

Archaeological site in Iran

- Tappa Gawri
- Tappeh Gabri
- Location in Iran
- 34°19′36″N 47°03′58″E
- Type: mound
- Periods: Chalcolithic, Bronze Age, Iron Age, Parthian, Sassanian
- Location: Kermanshah Province, Iran
- Region: Kermanshah

History
- Built: ca. 7,000 BP
- Abandoned: ca. 1,200 BP

Site notes
- Elevation: 1,350 m (4,430 ft)
- Height: 7
- Length: 250 m (820 ft)
- Width: 180 m (590 ft)
- Area: 2.60 ha (279,862 sq ft)
- Archaeologists: Louis D. LEVINE
- Condition: Under modern houses
- Owner: Ministry of Cultural Heritage, Tourism and Handicrafts, Iran

Tappa Gawri is an archaeological site in the Kermanshah, in Iran, about 240 meters (790 ft) from the south of the Ashayer Blvd (former Sanjabi Street). Tappa Gawri is one of the four mound sites in Kermanshah city. The other mound sites are Chogha Kaboud, Chogha Golan, and Morad Hasel. Tappeh Gawri includes two mounds, the larger is located north and is 400 meters (1,300 ft) by 300 meters (980 ft) and about 7 meters (23 ft) high. The southern mound is 200 meters (660 ft) by 160 meters (520 ft) and about 3 meters (9.8 ft) high. The site was recorded during an initial season of archaeological research in the Kermanshah and Mahidasht valleys, in the summer of 1975, by a team directed by Louis D. Levine from the Royal Ontario Museum, with the assistance of the Iranian Centre for Archaeological Research. They found surface archaeological material date to Chalcolithic, Bronze Age, Iron Age, Parthian, and Sassanian periods.
