= Killing of Reza Ghanbari =

January 2026 death during protests in Iran

- رضا قنبری
- Died: 3 January 2026 (aged 17); Kermanshah, Kermanshah province, Iran

Reza Ghanbari (Persian: رضا قنبری) was a 17-year-old Kurdish minor who was killed during protests in the Jafarabad neighborhood of Kermanshah on 3 January 2026. Security authorities reportedly pressured the family to describe Ghanbari as affiliated with the Basij and to attribute his death to protesters, which the family declined.

== Background ==
Starting on 28 December 2025, widespread protests erupted across Iran amid a deepening economic crisis and growing public frustration with government corruption, and demands for the end of the regime. The protests were Initially triggered by soaring inflation, skyrocketing food prices, and the Iranian rial's sharp depreciation, but quickly expanded into a broader movement demanding political change and the end of the Islamic Republic, with slogans like "Death to the Dictator", referring to supreme leader Ali Khamenei, and "Long live the Shah", referring to Reza Pahlavi. The demonstrations began in Tehran's Grand Bazaar, and spread to universities and major cities including Isfahan, Shiraz, and Mashhad, drawing students and merchants alike, many of whom cited government corruption, mismanagement, and prioritization of foreign conflicts over domestic needs as major grievances.

The economic crisis, worsened by the 2025 conflict with Israel, reimposed UN sanctions, chronic inflation (42.2% in December), and food and health price surges of 50–72%, left merchants struggling to trade and households struggling to survive. Calls for reform grew alongside outrage over energy shortages, water crises, and civil rights abuses, and by early January 2026, dozens of protesters had been arrested, with reports of security forces firing live ammunition directly at demonstrators.

== Death ==
Ghanbari was a 17-year-old Kurdish resident of Kermanshah who was killed during protests in the Jafarabad neighborhood on 3 January 2026 (13 Dey 1404). According to a source cited by the Kurdistan Human Rights Network, Ghanbari was present at the protests when members of the Islamic Revolutionary Guard Corps opened fire on demonstrators on Artesh Street at around 7:00 p.m. He was reportedly shot in the back and side and died at the scene. The source stated that security forces removed his body and that it had not been returned to his family at the time of reporting.

A funeral notice issued by the family announced that his burial would take place on 5 January 2026 in the village of Jabbarabad Sofla, in the Bilivar district of Kermanshah. The same source reported that the family was pressured to describe Ghanbari as affiliated with the Basij and to attribute his death to protesters, which they declined. Earlier reports documented the deaths of two brothers, Rasoul and Reza Kadivarion, Kurdish Yarsani residents of Kermanshah, who were killed during protests on the same date and in the same location.

== See also ==
- 2025–2026 Iranian protests
- 2026 Iran massacres
