= Jabbarabad-e Sofla =

Jabbarabad-e Sofla جبارابادسفلي
- Village
- Location within Iran
- Coordinates: 34°42′19″N 47°08′19″E
- Country: Iran
- Province: Kermanshah
- County: Kermanshah
- Bakhsh: Central
- Rural District: Poshtdarband

Population (2006)
  - Total: 171
- Time zone: UTC+3:30 (IRST)
  - Summer (DST): UTC+4:30 (IRDT)

Jabbarabad-e Sofla (Persian: جبارابادسفلي, also Romanized as Jabbārābād-e Soflá; also known as Jabbārābād-e Pā'īn) is a village in Poshtdarband Rural District, in the Central District of Kermanshah County, Kermanshah Province, Iran. At the 2006 census, its population was 171, in 45 families.
