= Quri Qala Cave =

Cave near Ravansar, Iran

Coordinates: 34°42′55″N 46°39′12″E

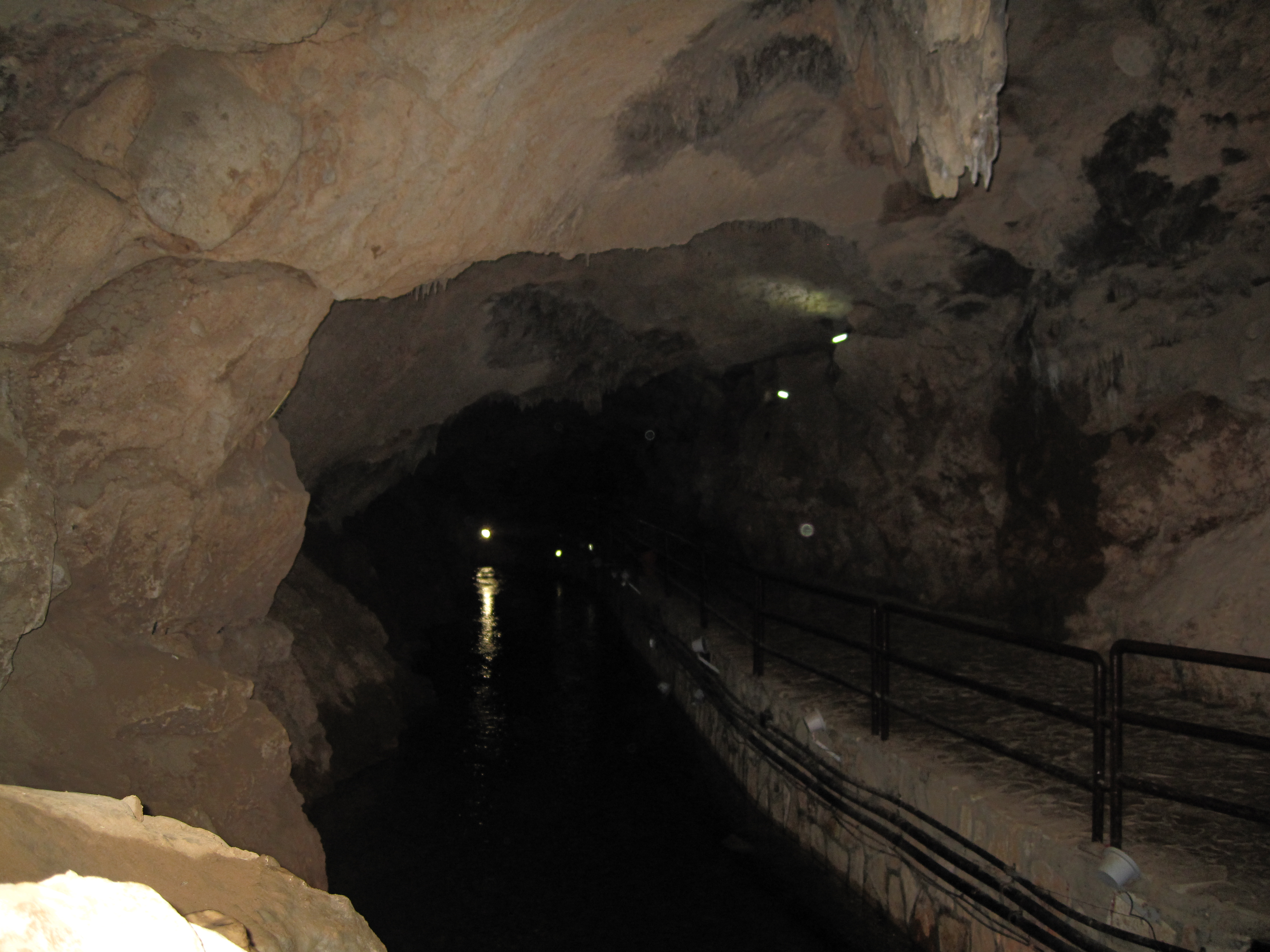

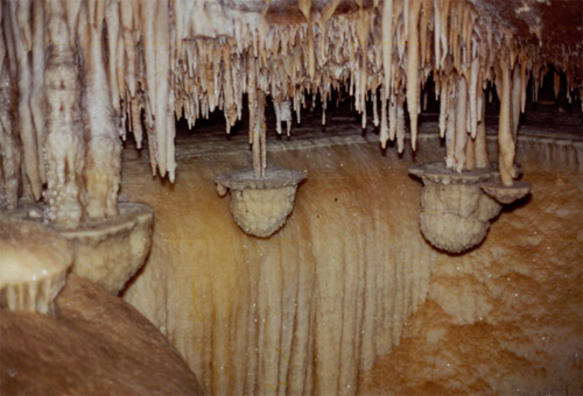

Quri Qala Cave or QuraQala (Kurdish: Şikefta QureQela, ئەشکەوتی قوڕەقەڵا Persian: غار قوری قلعه) is a cave located northwest of Ravansar, Iran, and is one of the longest caves in western Asia. First explored in the 1950s, in 1989 it was further opened by an Iranian team. It contains three main chambers, with calcite crystals, stalactites and waterfalls. It is known for its colony of Mouse-eared bat, and for a number of archaeological finds, including silver vessels dating to the late Sassanian period. These silver vessels are related to the late Sasanian period and decorated with a hawk catching a bird, birds, lions and a phoenix, suggests that they were probably offered to a Mithra temple located in the cave. Sasanian and Arab-Tabarian coins have also been found in the cave. The cave might have been a Mithra temple occupied from the late Sasanian period until probably the second century Hijrah.
