= Uprisings against Uthman =

First conflict amongst the Muslims

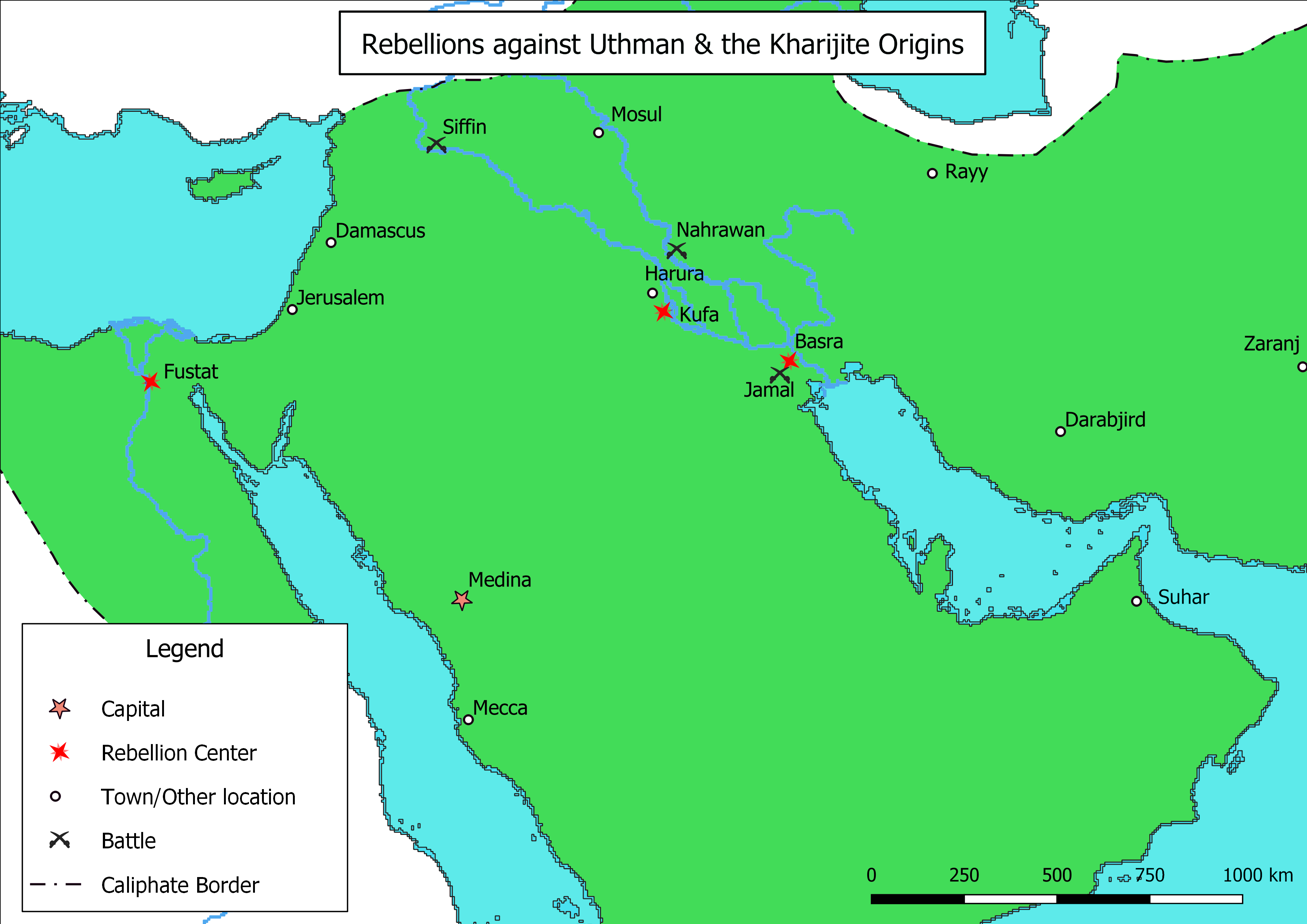
- Map depicting the sites of rebellion against Caliph Uthman and the origins of the Kharijite movement.
Date	654–656
Location	Egypt, Iraq and Medina
Result	Opposition victory: Collapse of central authority in Medina with Uthman's assassination; Election of Ali to the caliphate; Beginning of the First Fitna
Territorial changes	Provincial rebels gain control of Egypt, Iraq and Medina.

Belligerents
Rashidun Caliphate; Banu Umayya; Banu Hashim; Banu Asad	Opposition to Uthman; Egyptian rebels; Kufan rebels; Basran rebels

Commanders and leaders
Uthman ibn Affan X; Mu'awiya ibn Abi Sufyan; Marwan ibn al-Hakam (WIA); Abd Allah ibn Sa'd; Sa'id ibn al-As (WIA); Abd Allah ibn Amir; Abd Allah ibn al-Zubayr (WIA); Hasan ibn Ali (WIA); Muhammad ibn Talha	Abd al-Rahman ibn Udays; Malik al-Ashtar; Muhammad ibn Abi Hudhayfa; Hurqus ibn Zuhayr; Muhammad ibn Abi Bakr; Abd Allah ibn Budayl; Shurayh ibn Awfa al-Absi; Zayd ibn Suhan; Sa'sa'a ibn Suhan; Kumayl ibn Ziyad

Strength
Unknown	1,500 – 3,000

Casualties and losses
Unknown	Unknown

The Uprisings against Uthman were a series of political and military conflicts that developed during the later years of the caliphate of Uthman ibn Affan, particularly from 654 to 656. Opposition to Uthman's administration grew among groups in Egypt, Iraq, and Medina, eventually developing into armed rebellions and culminating in the assassination of Uthman in Medina in 656 by rebels from Egypt following the siege of his residence.

The opposition brought together groups with different grievances. The Qurrā, an influential group of Quran readers and early settlers, opposed aspects of Uthman's fiscal policies, including his efforts to have surplus revenue from conquered lands transferred to Medina. Other critics, including prominent companions of Muhammad and members of the Quraysh, accused Uthman of favoring his kinsmen from the Umayyad clan and appointing them to important positions at the expense of other early Muslims.

Following Uthman's regicide, the political order of the caliphate broke down, and Ali ibn Abi Talib was elected as his successor. However, his accession was rejected by Uthman's cousin Mu'awiya ibn Abi Sufyan, the Umayyad governor of Syria, who refused to recognize Ali's authority. The resulting struggle sparked the First Fitna, a civil war that reshaped the political and religious landscape of the early Islamic state.

== Background ==
The third caliph, Uthman ibn Affan, faced accusations of systemic nepotism by consolidating administrative power within the Umayyad family and their parent clan, the Banu Abd-Shams. Under his predecessors, Abu Bakr and Umar, political influence was balanced between the Ansar of Medina and the early Muhajirun. However, Uthman altered this dynamic by appointing kinsmen as governors and granting substantial land and monetary gifts to relatives, most notably Marwan ibn al-Hakam and Sa'id ibn al-As.

The crisis was further exacerbated by Uthman's efforts to centralize the Caliphate's fiscal affairs. He reclassified provincial crown lands as state assets and ordered that economic surpluses be forwarded to the central treasury in Medina. This policy directly challenged the autonomy of local tribal settlers who viewed these revenues as communal property. In Kufa, the governor Sa'id ibn al-As famously provoked a riot by declaring the fertile lands of the Sawad to be the "garden of the Quraysh." These centralization efforts, combined with the perceived marginalization of early Islamic elites, fueled organized opposition across Egypt, Iraq, and the Hijaz.

The emerging dissent was driven by a diverse coalition of actors. Political catalysts included senior companions of Muhammad, such as Talha ibn Ubayd Allah and Aisha bint Abi Bakr, who emerged as prominent critics and reportedly encouraged unrest. This discontent was further fueled by Uthman's perceived mistreatment of established tribal elites, such as the public beatings of Ammar ibn Yasir and a respected member of the Banu Makhzum, as well as the exile of Abu Dharr al-Ghifari, who had campaigned against the accumulation of wealth by the Umayyad elite.

Parallel to these grievances, a significant faction of the nascent opposition consisted of individuals who would later form the backbone of the Kharijite movement. Many were drawn from the qurra of Iraq, who merged political grievances with the theological belief that a caliph's legitimacy was contingent on strict adherence to religious justice. They sought to undermine the hegemony of the Quraysh and restore provincial autonomy. Based in Iraq, they were instrumental in the initial uprisings and later formed the Haruriyya. During this early period, they were among the most steadfast supporters of Ali's camp against the Umayyad administration.

== Uprisings ==
=== Uprising in Kufa ===
The political situation in Kufa deteriorated sharply in 654. In response, Caliph Uthman convened a consultative meeting in Medina with provincial governors and dispatched agents to inspect grievances in Kufa, Basra, Egypt, and Syria. However, the agent sent to Egypt, Ammar ibn Yasir, who was a supporter of Ali, defected and joined the local rebels.

When the Kufan governor, Sa'id ibn al-As, departed for the consultative summit in Medina, the opposition publicly demanded the Caliph's resignation. These protesters were primarily early settlers whose privileges were threatened by Uthman's centralization and the arrival of new tribal groups. The movement was coordinated by Yazid ibn Qays al-Arhabi, a tribal leader and future leader of the Muhakkima, who recalled exiled dissidents such as Malik al-Ashtar from Syria. Al-Ashtar mobilized the populace by alleging that the Caliph had ordered a drastic reduction in military and civilian stipends.

Exploiting the governor's absence, the rebels seized control of the city and deployed armed units to secure the province. They established a strategic garrison at Ayn al-Tamr to block the road to Damascus and stationed 1,000 troops near Hulwan to control the Jibal route. Further forces were positioned at Kashkar, al-Mada'in, and Jukah to defend against intervention from Basra and to police the Tigris region. Rebel commanders were explicitly instructed to obstruct all federal tax collection.

To cement their control, al-Ashtar dispatched 500 troops under Malik ibn Ka'b to intercept Sa'id ibn al-As on his return from Medina. Confronting the governor, the rebels famously declared that he would not drink another drop from the Euphrates, which forced him to retreat to Medina. Despite this military success, the rebels' appointment of the neutral Abu Musa al-Ash'ari as the new governor proved tactically flawed. His lack of support from the central government and his indecisive leadership left the Kufan administration in a state of political instability.

=== Uprising in Egypt ===
In 651, the Egyptian governor Abd Allah ibn Sa'd led a military expedition to Nubia that failed to achieve victory and resulted in a peace treaty with the Kingdom of Makuria. This military setback, combined with the governor's determination to increase the revenue sent to Medina, caused significant friction with the local garrison. The arrival of new settlers further strained Egyptian resources and marginalized the original conquerors of the province. This discontent peaked in 656 when Ibn Sa'd departed for the consultative meeting in Medina.

In the governor's absence, Muhammad ibn Abi Hudhayfa staged a coup against the provincial administration. Leveraging the unrest among the early Arab settlers, he effectively challenged Ibn Sa'd's authority, eventually forcing the governor to retreat from Fustat, the administrative capital of the province. While a loyalist faction led by Mu'awiya ibn Hudayj and Maslama ibn Mukhallad remained steadfast in their allegiance to the Caliph, the majority of the military garrison pledged their support to Ibn Abi Hudhayfa. His coalition was primarily composed of the original conquerors of the province, whose long-standing monopoly over Egyptian fiscal revenues and political autonomy had been systematically eroded by Uthman's centralization policies.

To de-escalate the crisis, Sa'd ibn Abi Waqqas traveled to Egypt to negotiate with the rebels. However, his mission failed when his tent was attacked and he was wounded, forcing his immediate return to Medina. Following this, approximately 400 protesters formed a delegation led by Muhammad ibn Abi Bakr to confront the Caliph.

=== The Rebel March on Medina ===
In 655, Caliph Uthman led the Hajj pilgrimage and organized a consultative council in Medina with his provincial governors to address the growing unrest. During the proceedings, some officials recommended a rigorous suppression of the agitators or the deployment of additional troops to key garrison towns to enforce order. Others advised the Caliph to address the administrative grievances directly by replacing unpopular officials. In contrast, prominent critics outside the administration, such as Amr ibn al-As, argued that the Caliph had deviated from the practices of his predecessors and condemned the concentration of power within the Umayyad clan.

Meanwhile, rebel contingents from Egypt, Kufa, and Basra mobilized in their respective provinces and coordinated a march on Medina to hold Uthman accountable and demand his resignation. The Egyptian contingent was led by Abd al-Rahman ibn Udays and included 600 men, while the Kufan and Basran contingents were led by Malik al-Ashtar and Hurqus ibn Zuhayr respectively. To avoid early detection, the delegations moved under the guise of performing the Hajj. The factions were divided in their political loyalties as the Egyptians favored Ali, the Basrans supported Talha, and the Kufans backed Zubayr.

During this time, Uthman's kinsman and the long-time governor of Syria, Mu'awiya ibn Abi Sufyan, offered Uthman military assistance or asylum in Damascus. However, the Caliph refused to leave the city of Muhammad or authorize military intervention against fellow Muslims. Despite Uthman's refusal, Mu'awiya dispatched a relief force of 4,000 Syrian troops under Habib ibn Maslama towards the Hejaz to secure the Caliph's position, acting on his own initiative to protect the integrity of the state.

Upon arriving at the Medina oasis, the groups established separate camps at Awas, Dhu Kushub, and Dhu-l-Marwah. Their presence shocked the local residents and initially pushed many Medinans to renew their support for the Caliph. When the rebels approached their preferred candidates for the caliphate, they were met with rejection. Ali personally drove the Egyptian delegation away and sent his son Hasan to guard Uthman's residence alongside the sons of other notable companions such as Talha and Zubayr. Ali eventually acted as a mediator and suggested the removal of the Egyptian governor, while the rebels demanded the appointment of their leader, Muhammad ibn Abi Bakr.

Although the rebels initially began a retreat from Medina after Uthman agreed to their demands for reform, the situation turned violent at Aqaba. There, the rebels intercepted a messenger carrying a secret letter bearing the Caliph's seal. The document, addressed to Ibn Sa'd, instructed the governor to arrest the delegation and execute its leaders.

Outraged by what they perceived as a betrayal, the rebels returned three days later to Medina to besiege the Caliph's residence. Uthman swore by God that he had no knowledge of the letter. This claim led to suspicions against his secretary, Marwan ibn al-Hakam, who held the seal at the time. While Madelung notes that Ali and Muhammad ibn Maslama suspected Marwan was the true author, historian Hugh N. Kennedy argues that Uthman likely bore responsibility for the order.

=== Siege of Uthman's Residence ===
In response to the intercepted letter, the rebels charged Caliph Uthman with incompetence and demanded his resignation. When he refused, the opposition began a formal siege of his residence. Although the rebels initially permitted Uthman to leave for communal prayers, they eventually denied him this right. During a Friday sermon, Uthman and his supporters were pelted with stones until the Caliph was carried home unconscious.

The gates of the residence were defended by a group of young Qurayshi nobles, including Abd Allah ibn al-Zubayr, Abd Allah ibn Abbas, Muhammad ibn Talha, Hasan ibn Ali, and Husayn ibn Ali. They were joined by other noblemen such as Abd Allah ibn Abd al-Rahman, a nephew of Zubayr ibn al-Awwam. He was killed by the rebels after attempting to propose a peaceful settlement based on the Quran. Inside the house, Uthman remained with his wife Na'ila bint al-Furafisa and his secretary Marwan ibn al-Hakam. Despite Uthman forbidding his defenders from escalating the conflict, a clash erupted when the rebels intercepted food supplies sent by Umm Habiba.

The rebels eventually blocked the supply of water to the house. Uthman appealed to Ali, who sent three large water skins through his Hashimite kinsmen, several of whom were reportedly injured while delivering the supplies. During the standoff, Uthman dispatched Abd Allah ibn Abbas to lead the Hajj and inform the people of Mecca about the siege. Fearing that loyalist reinforcements from Syria would soon arrive to crush the revolt, the rebels decided to storm the residence on 17 June 656.

The final assault avoided a direct confrontation with the Hashimite guards at the gate. Instead, a group led by Muhammad ibn Abi Bakr scaled the roofs of neighboring houses to enter Uthman's private quarters. They found the Caliph reciting the Quran. While some accounts state that Muhammad ibn Abi Bakr initially seized the Caliph's beard, he reportedly stepped back after Uthman reminded him of his father's legacy. The fatal blows were delivered by other rebels, including Kinana ibn Bishr and Sudan ibn Humran. Amr ibn al-Hamiq is described as inflicting multiple wounds on the Caliph's body during the struggle.

Uthman's blood poured over the copy of the Quran he was reading, and his wife Na'ila lost several fingers while attempting to shield him from the blades. While the house was looted, the Umayyad family fled Medina for Mecca and Damascus, carrying with them the severed fingers of Na'ila and the blood-stained clothing of the Caliph as symbols for their future demand for vengeance.

== Aftermath ==
Following the assassination of Uthman, Medina entered a state of total anarchy as the central government collapsed. The Syrian military vanguard sent by Mu'awiya withdrew at Wadi al-Qura when news of Uthman's murder reached its commander Habib ibn Maslama. In the absence of a caliph, the Egyptian rebels occupied the city and their representative, Al-Ghafiqi ibn Harb, acted as the de facto governor. The rebel factions attempted to dictate the choice of the next leader through the Shura, an act that deeply alienated the Medinan nobility who viewed it as an illegal restructuring of the Caliphate's political order.

Despite the pressure from the insurgent groups, Ali initially refused the office and insisted that any pledge of allegiance must be made publicly in the Prophet's Mosque. Five days after Uthman's death, Ali was formally elected as the fourth caliph. His administration was immediately faced with the consequences of the uprisings. The Umayyad clan and other critics of the new caliph used the failure to prosecute Uthman's killers as a casus belli, marking the beginning of the First Fitna and the permanent division of the Islamic community into sectarian factions.

== Sectarian interpretations ==
=== Sunni views ===
Mainstream Sunni tradition views the insurrection against Uthman as an unlawful rebellion that triggered the first great Fitna in Islamic history. While Sunni scholars acknowledge historical reports of grievances regarding the Caliph's administrative choices, they maintain that these issues did not justify a violent uprising. The rebels are generally viewed as a misguided or extremist group that violated the sanctity of the caliphate and the city of Medina. Sunni tradition emphasizes that Uthman acted as a martyr who followed the instructions of Muhammad to remain patient and avoid shedding Muslim blood.

This perspective holds that Uthman's financial and administrative decisions were based on his personal legal interpretation of the duty to maintain kinship. Modern scholarship similarly notes that the behavior of the opposition was often undutiful. This suggests that political rivals used general discontent to fuel a rebellion that they lacked the religious right to initiate. Rather than viewing the uprising as a pursuit of justice, Sunni tradition focuses on the illegitimacy of the rebels' methods and the catastrophic loss of unity following the assassination of a companion of Muhammad.

=== Shia views ===
Shia Muslims generally view the uprisings as a justified response to the systemic corruption and tribalism that emerged under Uthman's rule. This perspective holds that the centralization of power within the Umayyad family was a betrayal of the egalitarian principles of Muhammad. Historical Shia accounts highlight that Uthman gave control of vital provinces like Egypt and Kufa to his kinsmen who used their authority for personal gain. This incurred the hatred of the local populations and led to the collapse of the early Islamic state.

The Shia tradition emphasizes the mistreatment of respected companions who spoke out against these administrative failures. Figures like Abu Dharr al-Ghifari were exiled for protesting Umayyad excesses while others like Ammar ibn Yasir were physically beaten for presenting complaints against provincial governors. These acts of state violence against the early believers are seen as the primary catalysts for the revolt. While Ali and his sons sought to prevent total anarchy and provided relief to the besieged caliph, the Shia view maintains that the revolution was the inevitable result of Uthman prioritizing his relatives over true justice.

=== Ibadi views ===
Ibadi Muslims and the early Muhakkima traditions view the uprising as a legitimate religious act rather than a mere political rebellion. According to early Ibadi sources, the revolt was a necessary response to Uthman ceasing to act with justice. In their view, the interception of the caliph's letter served as the final proof that Uthman's administration had lost its moral authority. The rebels are viewed as the first true Kharijites, those who went out for the sake of God to uphold the principle of enjoining good and forbidding wrong.

Scholarship emphasizes that this event raised fundamental questions regarding the relationship between faith and leadership. For the groups that became the Kharijites, the commission of a grave sin without repentance nullified a leader's right to rule. From this perspective, Uthman's refusal to step down necessitated his removal to preserve the faith, establishing a precedent where the legitimacy of a ruler was tied to their strict adherence to Quranic principles and the duty to uphold divine justice.

== See also ==
- Battle of the Camel
- Battle of Siffin
- Umayyad annexation of Egypt

== Bibliography ==
- Ishmael, Adam Paul (2016). The Acclaimed Writings of Truth. Xlibris. ISBN 978-1-5245-5740-9.
- Al-Barrādī, Abū al-Qāsim (1885). Al-Jawahir al-Muntaqat [The Selected Jewels] (in Arabic). Cairo: Matba'at al-Arabiya.
- Momen, Moojan (1985). An Introduction to Shiʻi Islam: The History and Doctrines of Twelver Shiʻism. Yale University Press. ISBN 978-0-300-03499-8.
- Jafri, S.H.M. (1979). Origins and Early Development of Shi'a Islam. Longman. ISBN 0-582-78080-2.
- Abbas, Hassan (2021). The Prophet's Heir: The Life of Ali ibn Abi Talib. Yale University Press. ISBN 978-0-300-25205-7.
- Daftary, F. (2014). "'Alids". In Fleet, K.; Krämer, G.; Matringe, D.; Nawas, J.; Stewart, D.J. (eds.). Encyclopaedia of Islam (Third ed.). doi:10.1163/1573-3912_ei3_COM_26329. ISBN 978-90-04-17137-4.
- al-Suyuti, Jalal ad-Din (1995). The History of the Khalifahs who took the right way: being a translation of the chapters on al-Khulafa' ar-Rashidun from Tarikh al-Khulafa'. Translated by Clarke, Abdassamad. Ta-Ha Publishers. ISBN 978-1897940259.
- Ibn Sa'd, Muhammad (2013). Kitāb al-Ṭabaqāt al-Kabīr: The Companions of Badr. Vol. 3. Translated by Aisha Bewley. London: Ta-Ha Publishers. ISBN 978-1842001332.
- Madelung, W. (1997). The Succession to Muḥammad: A Study of the Early Caliphate. Cambridge University Press. ISBN 978-0-521-64696-3.
- Wellhausen, Julius (1927). The Arab Kingdom and Its Fall. Translated by Margaret Graham Weir. Calcutta: University of Calcutta.
- Hoffman, Valerie Jon (2012). The Essentials of Ibadi Islam. Syracuse: Syracuse University Press. ISBN 9780815650843.
- Petry, Carl F., ed. (1998). The Cambridge History of Egypt, Vol. 1: Islamic Egypt, 640–1517. Cambridge University Press. ISBN 978-0-521-47137-4.
- Aslan, Reza (2008). No God But God: The Origins, Evolution and Future of Islam. Random House. ISBN 978-1-4070-0928-5.
- Ibrahim, Mahmood (2011). Merchant Capital and Islam. University of Texas Press. ISBN 978-0-292-74118-8.
- Subani, Hamad (2013). The Secret History of Iran. Lulu.com. ISBN 978-1-304-08289-3.
- Timani, Hussam S. (2008). Modern Intellectual Readings of the Kharijites. Peter Lang. ISBN 978-0-8204-9701-3.
- Al-Sharqawi, Abd al-Rahman (2012). Ali: Imam al-Muttaqin [Ali: Imam of the Pious] (in Arabic). Dar al-Shuruq. ISBN 978-977-09-2506-5.
- Schmidtke, Sabine, ed. (2016). The Oxford Handbook of Islamic Theology. Oxford University Press. ISBN 978-0-19-106879-9.
- Koch, Bettina (2015). Patterns Legitimizing Political Violence in Transcultural Perspectives: Islamic and Christian Traditions and Legacies. Walter de Gruyter. ISBN 978-1-61451-394-0.
- Ibn Kathir, Abu al-Fida' 'Imad ad-Din Isma'il ibn 'Umar (1932). Al-Bidayah wa'l-Nihayah [The Beginning and the End] (in Arabic). Vol. 7. Cairo: Matba'at al-Sa'adah.
- Rida, Mohammad (2006). Imam Ali Ibn Abi Taleb: The Fourth Caliph. Dar Al Kotob Al Ilmiyah. ISBN 978-2-7451-5531-3.
- Suleiman, Yasir, ed. (2010). Living Islamic History: Studies in Honour of Professor Carole Hillenbrand. Edinburgh University Press. ISBN 978-0-7486-4219-9.
- El-Hibri, Tayeb (2010). Parable and Politics in Early Islamic History: The Rashidun Caliphs. Columbia University Press. ISBN 978-0-231-15082-8.
- Alamdar, Sayyid Hussein (2014). Radiance of Vicegerency. AuthorHouse. ISBN 978-1-4969-1732-4.
- Marsham, Andrew (2023). Umayyad Empire. Edinburgh University Press. ISBN 978-1-3995-2739-2.
- Ouda, Muhammad Abdullah; Farhat, Hikmat Abd al-Karim; Al-Khatib, Ibrahim Yasin (2025). Mukhtasar al-Tarikh al-Islami [A Brief History of Islam] (in Arabic). Amman: Dar al-Kitab al-Thaqafi.
- Ibrahim, Mahmood (2014). Merchant Capital and Islam. University of Texas Press. ISBN 978-0-292-76772-0.
- Ibn al-Tiqtaqa, Safi al-Din Muhammad ibn Ali (2014). Al-Fakhri fi al-Adab al-Sultaniyya [On the Systems of Government and the Moslem Dynasties] (in Arabic). IslamKotob. p. 80.
- Keaney, Heather N. (2013). Medieval Islamic Historiography: Remembering Rebellion. Routledge. ISBN 978-1-134-08099-1.
- Pakistan Political Science Association (1962). Proceedings of the All Pakistan Political Science Conference. Vol. 3. Lahore: The Association.
- Yadegari, Mohammad (1983). Ideological Revolution in the Muslim World. Indianapolis: International Graphics Printing Service (IGPS). ISBN 978-0-89259-040-7.
- Anthony, Sean W. (2011). The Caliph and the Heretic: Ibn Saba' and the Origins of Shi'ism. Brill. ISBN 978-90-04-20930-5.
- Armush, Muhammad (2021). Mujaz Tarikh Misr [A Summary of the History of Egypt] (in Arabic). A G Printing & Publishing.
- Muir, William (1891). The Caliphate: Its Rise, Decline, and Fall; from Original Sources. Religious Tract Society.
- Al-Maghlis, Hani Abbadi Muhammad Sayf (2014). Al-Ta'ah al-Siyasiyya fi al-Fikr al-Islami [Political Obedience in Islamic Thought] (in Arabic). International Institute of Islamic Thought (IIIT). ISBN 978-1-56564-604-9.
- Humphreys, R. Stephen (2006). Mu'awiya ibn Abi Sufyan: From Arabia to Empire. Oneworld. ISBN 1-85168-402-6.
- Kennedy, Hugh (2004). The Prophet and the Age of the Caliphates: The Islamic Near East from the Sixth to the Eleventh Century (2nd ed.). Pearson Longman. ISBN 978-0-582-40525-7.
- Morsi, Isma'il (2024). Al-Sirah al-Rashidah: Sirat al-Khulafa' al-Arba'ah [The Rightly Guided Biography: Biography of the Four Caliphs] (in Arabic). Dar Uktub.
- Marsham, Andrew (2024). The Umayyad Empire. Edinburgh University Press. doi:10.1515/9781399527392. ISBN 978-1-3995-2739-2.
- Stiles, Kendall (2024). Supplanting Empires: Power Transitions Across Human History. London: Bloomsbury Publishing. ISBN 978-1-6669-7434-8.
- Subhani, Ayatollah Ja‘far (2019). Resplendence of Wilayah: An Analytical Biography of Imam Ali (Furugh-i Wilayat). ICAS Press. ISBN 978-1-907905-48-3.
- Rogerson, Barnaby (2010). The Heirs Of The Prophet Muhammad: And the Roots of the Sunni-Shia Schism. Little, Brown Book Group. ISBN 978-0-7481-2470-1.
- Weston, Mark (2011). Prophets and Princes: Saudi Arabia from Muhammad to the Present. Turner Publishing Company. ISBN 978-1-118-11090-4.
- Moon, Farzana (2015). No Islam but Islam. Cambridge Scholars Publishing. ISBN 978-1-4438-7404-5.
- Zidan, Ahmad (1991). The Rightly Guided Caliphs. A.S. Noordeen. ISBN 978-9830650500.
- Bosworth, C. E. (1995). "Saʿīd b. al-ʿĀṣ". In Bosworth, C. E.; van Donzel, E.; Heinrichs, W. P. & Lecomte, G. (eds.). The Encyclopaedia of Islam, Second Edition. Volume VIII: Ned–Sam. Leiden: E. J. Brill. p. 853. ISBN 978-90-04-09834-3.
- Abdullah, Thabit A. J. (2014). A Short History of Iraq (2nd ed.). Routledge. ISBN 978-1-317-86419-6.
- Donner, Fred M. (2012) [2010]. Muhammad and the Believers, at the Origins of Islam. Cambridge, Massachusetts: Harvard University Press. ISBN 978-0-674-05097-6.
- Isawi, Isa (2021-02-08). أنساق الخطاب في شعر الخوارج: دراسة في الأنساق الأسلوبية (Patterns of Discourse in Kharijite Poetry: A Study of Stylistic Patterns) (in Arabic). Amman, Jordan: Markaz al-Kitab al-Akadimi. ISBN 978-9957-35-483-1.
- Hinds, Martin (1993). "Muʿāwiya I b. Abī Sufyān". In Bosworth, C. E.; van Donzel, E.; Heinrichs, W. P. & Pellat, Ch. (eds.). The Encyclopaedia of Islam, Second Edition. Volume VII: Mif–Naz. Leiden: E. J. Brill. pp. 263–268. ISBN 978-90-04-09419-2.
- Francesca, Ersilia (2015). Ibadi Theology: Rereading Sources and Scholarly Works. Studies on Ibadism and Oman. Vol. 4. Georg Olms Verlag. ISBN 978-3-487-14885-4.
- Bowering, Gerhard; Crone, Patricia; Mirza, Mahan (2013). The Princeton Encyclopedia of Islamic Political Thought. Princeton University Press. ISBN 978-0-691-13484-0.
- Knysh, Alexander (2015). Islam in Historical Perspective. London: Routledge. ISBN 9781317347118.
- Humphreys, R. Stephen, ed. (1990). The History of al-Ṭabarī, Volume XV: The Crisis of the Early Caliphate: The Reign of ʿUthmān, A.D. 644–656/A.H. 24–35. SUNY Series in Near Eastern Studies. Albany, New York: State University of New York Press. ISBN 978-0-7914-0154-5.
