= Muhammad ibn Abi Hudhayfa =

7th-century Egyptian rebel and governor

Muhammad ibn Abi Hudhayfa محمد بن أبي حذيفة

Governor of Egypt
- In office 656–657
- Caliphs: Uthman (r. 644–656); Ali (r. 656–661)
- Preceded by: Abd Allah ibn Sa'd
- Succeeded by: Qays ibn Sa'd

Personal details
- Born: c. 618–622 CE Abyssinia
- Died: May–June 657 CE (Dhu al-Hijja 36 AH) Jabal al-Jalil, near Homs
- Parent(s): Abu Hudhayfa ibn Utba; Sahla bint Suhayl
- Relatives: Salim ibn Ma'qil (adopted brother); Mu'awiya ibn Abi Sufyan (cousin)

Military service
- Allegiance: Rashidun Caliphate; Egyptian rebels
- Battles/wars: Battle of the Masts; Uprisings against Uthman; Umayyad invasions of Egypt (657–658) X

Muhammad ibn Abi Hudhayfa (Arabic: محمد بن أبي حذيفة, romanized: Muḥammad ibn ʾAbī Ḥudhayfa; died 657) was a Qurayshi leader and the governor of Egypt during the First Fitna. Although he was the foster son of Caliph Uthman ibn Affan, he became a leading opponent of Uthman's administration, citing grievances over nepotism and the appointment of Abd Allah ibn Sa'd.

In 656, Ibn Abi Hudhayfa led the revolt in Egypt that ousted Abd Allah ibn Sa'd and dispatched the Egyptian delegation to Medina that participated in the siege of the Caliph. A staunch partisan of Ali ibn Abi Talib, he was recognized as governor following Ali's accession but faced internal resistance from pro-Uthmanid loyalists in the Nile Delta. He was replaced by Qays ibn Sa'd in 657 and was subsequently captured and killed by Umayyad forces in Syria.

== Early life ==
Muhammad ibn Abi Hudhayfa was born in Abyssinia during the Migration to Abyssinia of the early Muslims. He was the son of Abu Hudhayfa ibn Utba, an early companion of Muhammad, and Sahla bint Suhayl. Following the deaths of his father and his father's mawla and adopted brother, Salim ibn Ma'qil, at the Battle of al-Yamama in 633, Muhammad was taken into the household of Uthman ibn Affan. Wilferd Madelung notes that Muhammad must have been at least ten years old when he entered Uthman's care, placing his birth roughly between 618 and 622 CE.

== Military career ==
=== Participation in the Battle of the Masts ===
Ibn Abi Hudhayfa was a member of the Egyptian fleet during the Battle of the Masts in 655, a pivotal naval engagement between the Rashidun Caliphate and the Byzantine Empire. According to the historian al-Waqidi, Ibn Abi Hudhayfa traveled to the battle aboard a ship manned by Copts.

During the engagement, the Byzantine fleet under Constans II faced the Muslim fleet led by Abd Allah ibn Sa'd. The battle developed into close combat after the fleets engaged at sea, with ships lashed together. The Byzantines initially gained advantage, but the fighting ended in a Muslim victory with heavy Byzantine losses.

== Revolt against Uthman ==
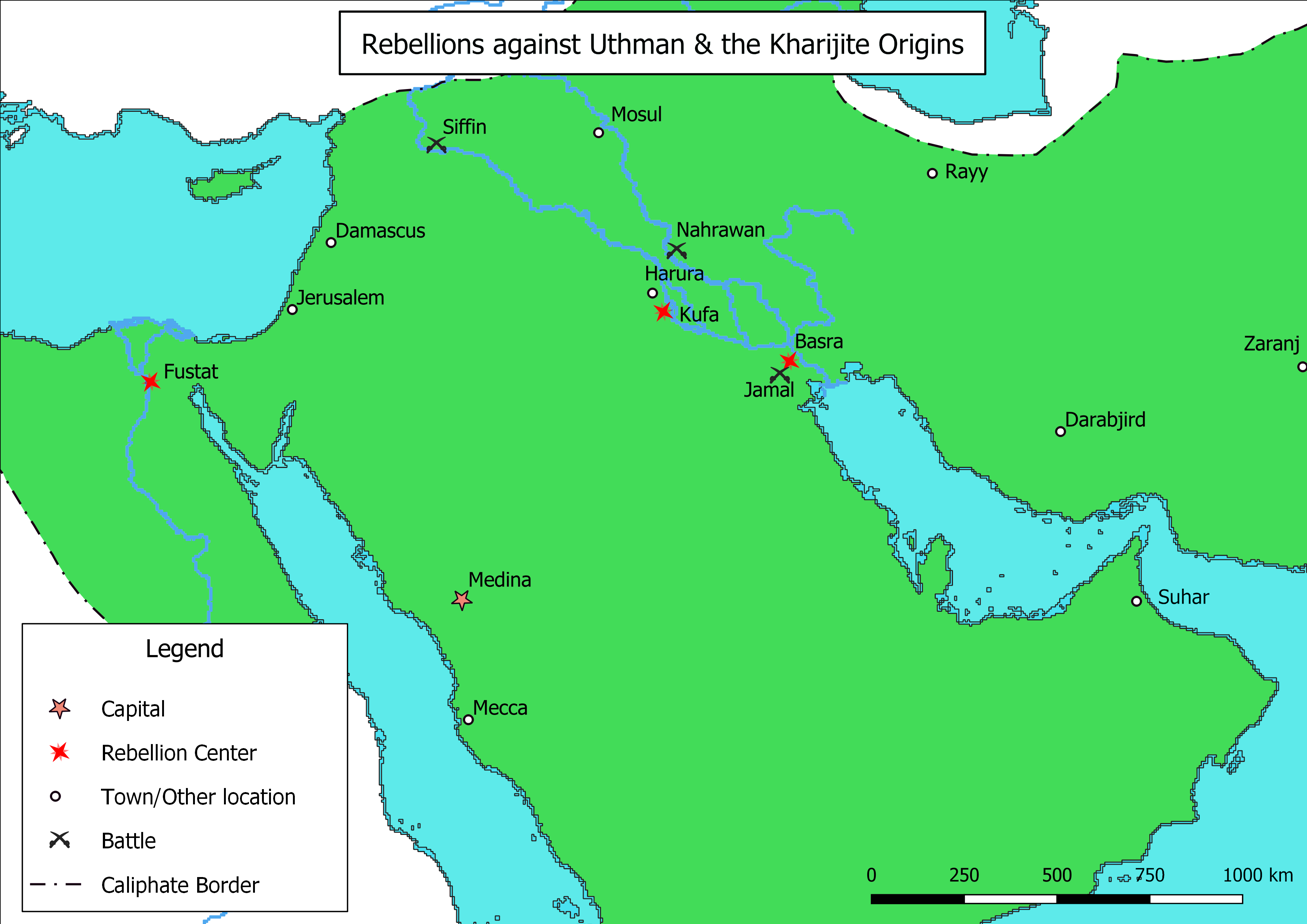
Map showing the centers of rebellion against Uthman.

=== Motivations for opposition ===
Wilferd Madelung suggests that Ibn Abi Hudhayfa’s rebellion was rooted in a combination of personal and religious grievances. He reportedly resented Uthman for prioritizing kinsmen who were viewed as outlaws or sons of the Islamic prophet Muhammad's enemies over him. This was particularly significant because Ibn Abi Hudhayfa was the son of an early companion and martyr of Islam.

A primary driver for his dissent was the appointment of Abd Allah ibn Sa'd as governor. Ibn Abi Hudhayfa criticized the choice of a man who had previously apostatized and was allegedly the subject of Quranic verse 6:93. These factors allowed him to frame his political opposition as a moral duty to restore the integrity of the Caliphate. Madelung concludes that while some traditions attribute his grudge to a legal punishment for drinking wine, such accounts are likely fictional attempts to discredit his character.

=== Agitation in Egypt ===
During the reign of Uthman, Abd Allah ibn Sa'd's tenure as governor of Egypt was marked by growing instability. His military prestige was weakened following failed expeditions into Nubia. Furthermore, his aggressive economic policy of increasing provincial revenue and forwarding it to the central administration in Medina met with fierce opposition from the local Arab garrison, who viewed such wealth as their right by virtue of conquest. Muhammad ibn Abi Hudhayfa, serving as Ibn Sa'd’s deputy and head of the local security forces, emerged as a primary leader of the opposition. Alongside his ally Muhammad ibn Abi Bakr, Ibn Abi Hudhayfa engaged in consistent agitation against the Caliph's policies.

In an attempt to appease him, Uthman reportedly sent Ibn Abi Hudhayfa 30,000 dirhams; however, Ibn Abi Hudhayfa rejected the gift and instead displayed the coins in the Mosque of Fustat, using the money as visual evidence of Uthman's alleged corruption to further incite the populace. When Uthman dispatched the prominent companion Ammar ibn Yasir to Egypt to investigate the unrest, Ammar instead defected to the opposition, aligning himself with Ibn Abi Hudhayfa. This alliance significantly exacerbated regional tensions as a Pro-Alid movement began to take firm hold in Egypt.

== Governorship of Egypt (656–657) ==
In 656, when Ibn Sa'd departed for Medina to defend his administration before the Caliph and attend a general consultation of provincial governors, Muhammad ibn Abi Hudhayfa seized the opportunity to oust him from authority. He was supported by a majority of the veterans of the Arab conquest, who shifted their allegiance to him; consequently, he took full control of Fustat and was recognized as the de facto leader of the province.

From this position of power, Ibn Abi Hudhayfa organized and dispatched a force of approximately 500 to 1,000 Egyptian rebels to the capital. He appointed Abd al-Rahman ibn Udays to lead this delegation with the intent of holding Uthman accountable for his administrative policies. The delegation later became part of the broader opposition that gathered in Medina during the siege of Uthman’s residence.

Following the Assassination of Uthman and the accession of Ali as Caliph, Muhammad ibn Abi Hudhayfa’s authority was immediately challenged by a loyalist revolt in the district of Kharbita, near Alexandria. This opposition was led by the pro-Uthmanid notables Maslama ibn Mukhallad and Muawiya ibn Hudayj, who demanded qisas (retribution) for the late caliph's blood. Although Muhammad's forces engaged the rebels in the Battle of Kharbita, he was unable to achieve a decisive victory or pacify the region.

This stalemate left the province unstable and divided. While Muhammad maintained control of the capital at Fustat, the powerful Uthmaniyya faction in Kharbita remained a persistent threat to his administration. This internal fragmentation significantly weakened his governate, ultimately leading Caliph Ali to replace him with the veteran administrator Qays ibn Sa'd in 657 to restore order.

== Death ==
Following his dismissal from the governorship of Egypt in 657, Muhammad ibn Abi Hudhayfa attempted to join Ali in Medina. However, according to the historian Julius Wellhausen, Mu'awiya and Amr ibn al-As managed to entice him to the border at Arish on the Palestinian frontier. They successfully apprehended him there, preventing him from reaching the Caliph's side.

Ibn Abi Hudhayfa was subsequently taken to Syria and imprisoned at Jabal al-Jalil near Homs along with a group of fellow rebels, including Abd al-Rahman ibn Udays. While Uthmanid traditions later circulated reports of his condemnation to justify his fate, most historical accounts agree that he and his companions attempted a prison break. According to reports from the Egyptian scholar al-Layth ibn Sa'd, Muhammad ibn Abi Hudhayfa was pursued during the escape and killed by a Yemenite in the Islamic month of Dhu al-Hijja 36 AH (May–June 657 CE).

== Bibliography ==
- Jafri, S.H.M. (1979). Origins and Early Development of Shi'a Islam. Longman. ISBN 0-582-78080-2.
- Ibn Sa'd, Muhammad (2013). Kitab at-Tabaqat al-Kabir, Volume III: The Companions of Badr. Translated by Aisha Bewley. London: Ta-Ha Publishers. ISBN 978-1842001332.
- Abbas, Hassan (2021). The Prophet's Heir: The Life of Ali ibn Abi Talib. Yale University Press. ISBN 978-0-300-25205-7.
- Kennedy, Hugh (2004). The Prophet and the Age of the Caliphates: The Islamic Near East from the Sixth to the Eleventh Century (2nd ed.). Pearson Longman. ISBN 978-0-582-40525-7.
- Madelung, W. (1997). The Succession to Muḥammad: A Study of the Early Caliphate. Cambridge University Press. ISBN 978-0-521-64696-3.
- El-Hibri, Tayeb (2010). Parable and Politics in Early Islamic History: The Rashidun Caliphs. New York: Columbia University Press. ISBN 9780231150828.
- Petry, Carl F., ed. (1998). The Cambridge History of Egypt: Islamic Egypt, 640–1517. Vol. 1. Cambridge: Cambridge University Press. ISBN 0-521-47137-0.
- Wellhausen, Julius (1927). The Arab Kingdom and Its Fall. Translated by Margaret Graham Weir. Calcutta: University of Calcutta.
- Humphreys, R. Stephen, ed. (1990). The History of al-Ṭabarī, Volume XV: The Crisis of the Early Caliphate: The Reign of ʿUthmān, A.D. 644–656/A.H. 24–35. SUNY Series in Near Eastern Studies. Albany, New York: State University of New York Press. ISBN 978-0-7914-0154-5.
- Hawting, G. R., ed. (1996). The History of al-Ṭabarī, Volume XVII: The First Civil War: From the Battle of Siffīn to the Death of ʿAlī, A.D. 656–661/A.H. 36–40. SUNY Series in Near Eastern Studies. Albany, New York: State University of New York Press. ISBN 978-0-7914-2393-6.

Preceded by Abd Allah ibn Sa'd	Governor of Egypt; 656–657	Succeeded by Qays ibn Sa'd
