= Abd al-Rahman ibn Udays =

Egyptian commander in the assassination of Uthman

Abd al-Rahman ibn Udays عبد الرحمن بن عديس البلوي
- Died: May–June 657 CE (Dhu'l-Hijja 36 AH); Jabal al-Jalil, Bilad al-Sham, Rashidun Caliphate
- Cause of death: Execution
- Military career
- Allegiance: Rashidun Caliphate; Egyptian rebels (against Uthman)
- Unit: Egyptian Jund
- Commands: Egyptian rebel contingent
- Known for: Leading the Egyptian uprising against Uthman
- Conflicts: Arab conquest of Egypt; Uprisings against Uthman; First Fitna; Umayyad invasions of Egypt (executed)

Abd al-Raḥmān ibn Udays al-Balawī (Arabic: عبد الرحمن بن عديس البلوي; fl. 628–657) was a 7th-century Arab military commander and a primary leader of the Egyptian opposition during the provincial revolts of the early Caliphate. A veteran of the Arab conquest of Egypt, he rose to historical prominence as the supreme commander of the Egyptian contingent that marched on Medina in 656 CE. His leadership was instrumental in the blockade of the third Caliph, Uthman, and he is identified in some primary sources as a key figure in the events leading to the Caliph's assassination.

Ibn Udays remains a subject of debate within Islamic biographical literature due to his role in the rebellion and his reported status as a companion of the Islamic prophet Muhammad. Following the accession of Ali, Ibn Udays was intercepted and executed by the partisans of Mu'awiya I during the opening stages of the First Fitna.

== Early life and settlement in Egypt ==
Abd al-Rahman ibn Udays was a member of the Banu Bali and converted to Islam in early 628 CE (6 AH) during the period of the tribal delegations to Medina. Primary and modern sources report that he was a companion of Muhammad and that he participated in both the Pledge of the Tree and the Arab conquest of Egypt.

Following the campaign, he settled in Egypt as a veteran cavalryman. According to Egyptian historical records, Ibn Udays occupied a property in Fustat known as the White Palace (al-Dar al-Bayda), which was strategically located directly in front of the mosque and the residence of the commander Amr ibn al-As. Historical accounts also note that the house of Ibn Udays was located directly adjacent to the residence of Abd al-Rahman ibn Muljam.

This site remained a point of historical contention until 65 AH, when Marwan I visited Egypt and ordered a permanent palace to be built on the location within two months, reportedly deeming the previous structure unsuitable for his rank. Modern historians, such as Wilferd Madelung, have noted that this construction likely involved the formal confiscation of the property belonging to the Caliph's former political enemy.

== Rebellion and Siege of Medina ==
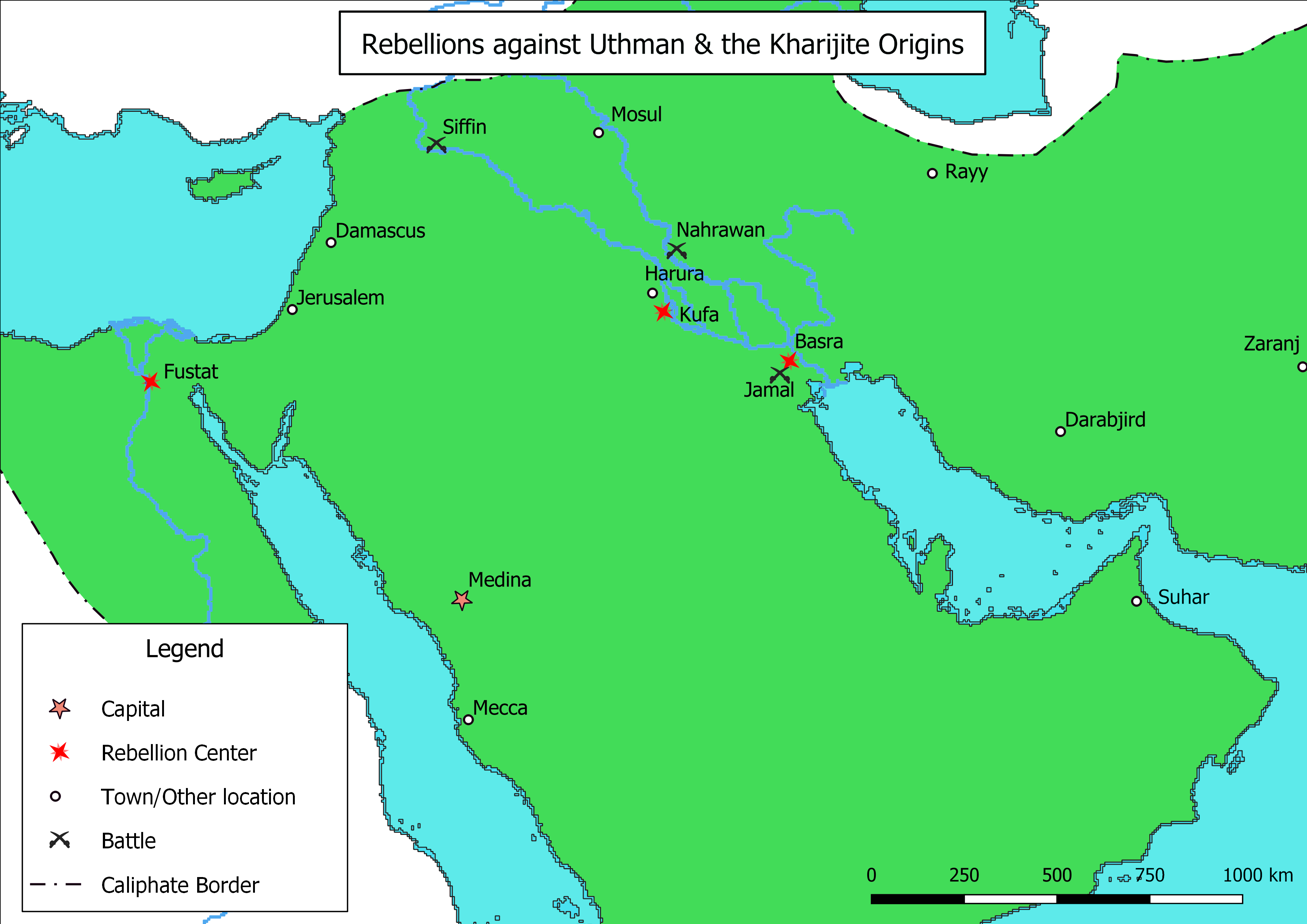
Geographical distribution of the uprisings against Uthman.

=== Command of the Egyptian Contingent ===
As provincial tensions escalated, Ibn Udays emerged as the primary spokesman and military commander for the Egyptian opposition. In this capacity, he formally presented the grievances of the Egyptian contingent, specifically citing the administrative abuses of governor Abd Allah ibn Sa'd, including his maltreatment of both Muslims and protected peoples (ahl al-dhimma) and his arbitrary appropriation of the Muslims' booty. These economic and political frictions were further compounded by the arrival of new Arab settlers that placed intense pressure on local resources, alongside broader discontent over the failure to conquer Nubia and the diversion of provincial revenues away from the local veteran garrison.

In 656 CE, Ibn Udays was appointed as a supreme commander of the Egyptian contingent, leading a force of approximately five hundred to one thousand men. According to the historian Ibn Ishaq, this force was organized into four brigades, each led by a chief carrying a banner, with overall command shared between Ibn Udays and Amr ibn Budayl. Upon setting out from Bilbays, Ibn Udays reportedly composed verses declaring that his cavalry came "demanding God’s due" (ḥaqq Allāh) against the administration.

During initial negotiations at Dhi Khushub, Ibn Udays met with the Medinan negotiator Muhammad ibn Maslamah. According to the account of the meeting, Ibn Udays addressed him as "Abu 'Abd al-Rahman" and asked, "Do you enjoin anything upon us?" before agreeing to a temporary withdrawal of his forces based on the Caliph's promises of reform.

=== Coordination of the Siege ===
Following the collapse of negotiations, Ibn Udays functioned as the strategic coordinator for the rebel forces during the Siege of Uthman's Residence. He established his headquarters at the Prophet's Mosque and was observed directing military engagements in the surrounding streets. When Marwan ibn al-Hakam emerged to challenge the rebels, Ibn Udays exercised command by ordering his subordinates to engage Marwan in single combat. Modern scholarship, notably Martin Hinds, identifies him as a key figure in the "Raja" which refers to the veteran oppositionists who returned to Medina to ensure the uprising's conclusion.

== Death and execution ==
Following the appointment of Qays ibn Sa'd as governor of Egypt, Ibn Udays and Muhammad ibn Abi Hudhayfa departed for Medina to join the forces of Ali. However, Mu'awiya I established border watches and intercepted the group near the border of Palestine. Ibn Udays was subsequently imprisoned at Jabal al-Jalil, where he was executed in 657 CE.

An Egyptian Uthmanid tradition narrates a hadith on the authority of Ibn Udays in which the Islamic prophet Muhammad predicted that certain people would revolt and "stray from the faith as the arrow strays from the game animal," and that they would be killed at Mount Lebanon and al-Jalil. Historians note that by attributing this report to Ibn Udays himself, the tradition effectively depicts him as the transmitter of his own condemnation by Muhammad.

== Bibliography ==
- Kister, M. J. (2022). Concepts and Ideas at the Dawn of Islam. Taylor & Francis. ISBN 978-1-000-58519-3.
- Ibn ‘Abd al-Ḥakam, Abu'l Qasim ‘Abd al-Raḥmān (1922). Torrey, Charles Cutler (ed.). The History of the Conquest of Egypt, North Africa and Spain: Known as Futūḥ Miṣr (in Arabic). New Haven: Yale University Press.
- Madelung, W. (1997). The Succession to Muḥammad: A Study of the Early Caliphate. Cambridge University Press. ISBN 978-0-521-64696-3.
- Al-Dhahabi, Shams al-Din (1996). Marouf, Bashar Awad (ed.). Siyar A'lām al-Nubalā': Siyar al-Khulafa' al-Rashidun [Biographies of Noble Figures: Biographies of the Rightly Guided Caliphs] (in Arabic). Beirut: Mu'assasat al-Risalah. OCLC 912088985.
- Ibn Sa'd, Muhammad (1997). Kitab at-Tabaqat al-Kabir, Volume I: The Men of Medina. Translated by Aisha Bewley. London: Ta-Ha Publishers. ISBN 9781897940624.
- Humphreys, R. Stephen, ed. (1990). The History of al-Ṭabarī, Volume XV: The Crisis of the Early Caliphate: The Reign of ʿUthmān, A.D. 644–656/A.H. 24–35. SUNY Series in Near Eastern Studies. Albany, New York: State University of New York Press. ISBN 978-0-7914-0154-5.
- Hinds, Martin (1996). Bacharach, Jere L.; Conrad, Lawrence I.; Crone, Patricia (eds.). Studies in Early Islamic History. Darwin Press. ISBN 9780878501090.
- El-Hibri, Tayeb (2010). Parable and Politics in Early Islamic History: The Rashidun Caliphs. New York: Columbia University Press. ISBN 9780231150828.
- Siddiqi, Muhammad Yasin Mazhar (1987). Organisation of Government Under the Prophet. IAD Religio-Philosophy (Original) Series. Delhi: Idarah-i Adabiyat-i Delli. OCLC 19039873.
- Wellhausen, Julius (1927). The Arab Kingdom and Its Fall. Translated by Margaret Graham Weir. Calcutta: University of Calcutta.
- Kubiak, Wladyslaw B. (1987). Al-Fustat: Its Foundation and Early Urban Development. Cairo: The American University in Cairo Press. ISBN 9789774241680.
- Petry, Carl F., ed. (1998). Cambridge History of Egypt, Volume One: Islamic Egypt, 640–1517 : Egypt as a Province in the Islamic Caliphate, 641–868. Cambridge: Cambridge University Press. ISBN 0-521-47137-0.
