= Kharija ibn Hudhafa =

Companion of Muhammad and military commander (died 661)

Kharija ibn Hudhafa (Arabic: خارجة بن حذافة, romanized: Khārija ibn Ḥudhāfa; died 22 January 661) was a companion of Muhammad and a commander in the Muslim conquest of Egypt during the reign of Caliph Umar (r. 634–644). He served as the chief judge and commander of the security forces in Egypt under its governor Amr ibn al-As.

== Life ==
Kharija ibn Hudhafa hailed from the Quraysh tribe of Mecca. The specific clan to which he belonged is a matter of contradiction in the traditional Muslim sources; the Banu Sahm, Banu Adi and Banu Amir ibn Lu'ayy are all mentioned as Kharija's clan. Kharija was a companion of the Islamic prophet Muhammad, and gained distinction for his bravery and horsemanship.

In 640, Caliph Umar (r. 634–644) dispatched him as one of four commanders an Arab army led by Zubayr ibn al-Awwam to reinforce the campaign of Amr ibn al-As to conquer Byzantine Egypt. After the Muslim victory at the Battle of Heliopolis, Amr had Kharija's brother Abd Allah take possession of Heliopolis and establish terms with the inhabitants of the surrounding villages. After the fall of Babylon in April 641, Amr dispatched Kharija to conquer the Fayyum oasis, Hermopolis, Akhmim, Bashrudat and the villages of Upper Egypt and make similar terms with their inhabitants.

While Amr was away besieging Alexandria, he left Kharija as his deputy over the Arab capital in Egypt, Fustat. He made Kharija the qadi (chief judge) of Egypt, where he became popular, and the head of his shurta (select troops or security forces). He remained in this office for at least two years into Caliph Uthman's reign (644–656) or throughout Uthman's reign. As opposition to Uthman culminated with a siege of his house in Medina, Kharija was at the forefront of the Uthmaniyya in Egypt calling to support the caliph.

Following the Umayyad annexation of Egypt, Kharija was restored to the head of the shurta by Amr ibn al-As, who had been reinstated as the governor of Egypt. On 22 January 661, Amr made Kharija stand in for him to lead the Friday prayers as he was ill. A Kharijite assassin intending to kill Amr during the prayers killed Kharija instead, mistaking him for Amr. The assassin was subsequently apprehended and executed by Amr. In a letter sent to the latter in the aftermath of the assassination, Caliph Mu'awiya I (r. 661–680) called Kharija a shaykh (chief or elder) of the Quraysh and consoled Amr as Kharija's "paternal uncle and his companion, above his male relatives".

== Bibliography ==
- Ahmed, Asad Q. (2010). The Religious Elite of the Early Islamic Ḥijāz: Five Prosopographical Case Studies. Oxford: University of Oxford Linacre College Unit for Prosopographical Research. ISBN 978-1-900934-13-8.
- Bruning, Jelle (2018). The Rise of a Capital: Al-Fusṭāṭ and Its Hinterland, 18-132/639-750. Leiden and Boston: Brill. ISBN 978-90-04-36635-0.
- Hawting, G. R., ed. (1996). The History of al-Ṭabarī, Volume XVII: The First Civil War: From the Battle of Siffīn to the Death of ʿAlī, A.D. 656–661/A.H. 36–40. SUNY Series in Near Eastern Studies. Albany, New York: State University of New York Press. ISBN 978-0-7914-2393-6.
- Hitti, Philip Khuri (2011) [1916]. The Origins of the Islamic State: Being a Translation from the Arabic Accompanied With Annotations, Geographic and Historic Notes of the Kitab Futuh al-Buldan. New York: Cosimo Classics. ISBN 978-1-61640-534-2.
- Humphreys, R. Stephen, ed. (1990). The History of al-Ṭabarī, Volume XV: The Crisis of the Early Caliphate: The Reign of ʿUthmān, A.D. 644–656/A.H. 24–35. SUNY Series in Near Eastern Studies. Albany, New York: State University of New York Press. ISBN 978-0-7914-0154-5.
- Raisuddin, Abu Nayeem Muhammad (April 1981). "Amr ibn al-As and His Conquest of Egypt". Islamic Culture. 55 (4): 277–290.
- Wensinck, A. J. (1960). "ʿAmr b. al-ʿĀṣ al-Sahmī". In Gibb, H. A. R.; Kramers, J. H.; Lévi-Provençal, E.; Schacht, J.; Lewis, B. & Pellat, Ch. (eds.). The Encyclopaedia of Islam, Second Edition. Volume I: A–B. Leiden: E. J. Brill. p. 451. OCLC 495469456.
