= Abd Allah ibn Budayl =

7th-century military commander

ʿAbd Allāh ibn Budayl عبد الله بن بديل
- Died: 657 CE; Siffin, Syria
- Father: Budayl ibn Warqa al-Khuza'i
- Relatives: Abd al-Rahman, Amr, Nafi (brothers)
- Military career
- Allegiance: Muhammad (630–632); Rashidun Caliphate (632–657)
- Service years: c. 630s–657 CE
- Conflicts: Conquest of Mecca; Battle of Hunayn; Expedition of Tabuk; Uprisings against Uthman; First Fitna; Battle of the Camel; Battle of Siffin †

ʿAbd Allāh ibn Budayl ibn Warqa’ al-Khuzaʽi (Arabic: عبد الله بن بديل بن ورقاء الخزاعي; (fl. 620s – 657 CE) was a companion of the Islamic prophet Muhammad and a participant in the early Muslim conquests, taking part in campaigns such as the Conquest of Mecca, Battle of Hunayn, and the Expedition of Tabuk. A member of the Banu Khuza'ah tribe, he later took part in the conquest of Isfahan under Caliph Umar, though early traditions reject his participation on the grounds that he was too young.

During Umar's caliphate, Abd Allah suffered mistreatment that helped draw him towards Ali. He later became an outspoken opponent of the third caliph, Uthman, and traveled to Medina, where he joined the opposition during the siege of Uthman's residence. During the First Fitna, Abd Allah fought on Ali's side at the Battle of the Camel and the Battle of Siffin. Regarded by his contemporaries as one of the five most respected Arab strategists, he was killed in 657 while leading an attack against the forces of Mu'awiya ibn Abi Sufyan.

== Early life and military campaigns ==
Abd Allah ibn Budayl was a companion of the Islamic prophet Muhammad and a member of the Muhajirun. (Note: Converts to Islam who emigrated from Mecca to Medina) He was the son of Budayl ibn Warqa al-Khuza'i, also a companion of Muhammad, to whom Muhammad had sent a letter inviting him to accept Islam. His family was involved in the early Islamic state, and his brother Nafi was killed in the Massacre of Bi'r Ma'una. Abd Allah later participated in several military campaigns, including the Conquest of Mecca, Battle of Hunayn, and the Expedition of Tabuk.

== Political activities and opposition to Uthman ==
While al-Tabari rejects his participation in the campaigns of the Muslim conquest of Persia on the grounds that he was too young, other accounts credit an expedition against Isfahan to him under Caliph Umar in 644/645 CE. According to these accounts, despite varying reports regarding his coordination with Abu Musa al-Ash'ari, Abd Allah led the primary effort to capture the city of Jayy through military pressure and diplomatic negotiation, securing a surrender and terms of protection and jizya after intercepting the fleeing local Marzban.

Abd Allah later became a prominent opponent of Uthman ibn Affan (r. 644–656), traveling to Medina from the provinces as a key opposition leader. During the siege of Uthman's residence in 656, Abd Allah killed the Caliph's defender al-Mughira ibn al-Akhnas. His brother Amr ibn Budayl, also a companion of Muhammad, was a co-commander of the Egyptian contingent alongside Abd al-Rahman ibn Udays and was among those who struck the Caliph.

== First Fitna ==
Following the Assassination of Uthman, Abd Allah supported Caliph Ali and fought alongside his brother Abd al-Rahman ibn Budayl at the Battle of the Camel. El-Hibri suggests that the harsh treatment Abd Allah experienced during the reign of Umar may have influenced his support for Ali.

Later, at the Battle of Siffin in 657, Abd Allah commanded the right wing of Ali's army against the forces of Habib ibn Maslama al-Fihri. His brother Abd al-Rahman also fought for Ali. During the fighting, Abd Allah led a contingent of Qurra (Quran readers) in an advance toward the pavilion of Mu'awiya.

The Syrian forces pushed back Ali's right wing, temporarily cutting Abd Allah off from the rest of the army. Malik al-Ashtar rallied the retreating troops and restored the line. Despite al-Ashtar's advice to hold his position, Abd Allah launched another assault on Mu'awiya's camp. He was surrounded and killed alongside several companions. Madelung suggests that his final charge was motivated by a desire to avenge his brother Amr ibn Budayl.

=== Reputation ===
During the First Fitna, Abd Allah was ranked by his contemporaries as one of the five most esteemed strategists among the Arabs, alongside Mu'awiya I, Amr ibn al-As, Qays ibn Sa'd, and al-Mughira ibn Shu'ba. Of this group, Abd Allah and Qays ibn Sa'd became the primary supporters of Ali ibn Abi Talib, positioning him directly against the political ambitions of his peers.

== Bibliography ==
- Ibn Sa'd, Muhammad (2012). Kitab at-Tabaqat al-Kabir, Volume VI: The Scholars of Kufa. Translated by Aisha Bewley. London: Ta-Ha Publishers. ISBN 9781842001240.
- ibn Rāshid, Maʿmar (2015-10-15). Anthony, Sean W. (ed.). The Expeditions: An Early Biography of Muḥammad. Library of Arabic Literature. Vol. 20. Translated by Anthony, Sean W.; Abdel Haleem, M. A. S. New York University Press. ISBN 978-1479816828. ISSN 2691-9850.
- ibn Rāshid, Maʿmar (2014). al-Ḥimyarī, ʻAbd al-Razzāq ibn Hammām; Anthony, Sean W. (eds.). The Expeditions: An Early Biography of Muḥammad. Translated by Anthony, Sean W.; Abdel Haleem, M. A. S. New York University Press. ISBN 978-0-8147-6963-8.
- Ibn Ishaq, Muhammad (1955). The Life of Muhammad: A Translation of Ishaq's Sirat Rasul Allah. Translated by A. Guillaume. Karachi: Oxford University Press.
- al-Baladhuri, Ahmad ibn Yahya (2022). History of the Arab Invasions: The Conquest of the Lands: A New Translation of al-Baladhuri's Futuh al-Buldan. Translated by Kennedy, Hugh. Bloomsbury Publishing. ISBN 978-0-7556-3742-3.
- Bosworth, Clifford Edmund (2007). Historic Cities of the Islamic World. Brill. ISBN 978-90-474-2383-6.
- El-Hibri, Tayeb (2010). Parable and Politics in Early Islamic History: The Rashidun Caliphs. New York: Columbia University Press. ISBN 9780231150828.
- Madelung, W. (1997). The Succession to Muḥammad: A Study of the Early Caliphate. Cambridge University Press. ISBN 978-0-521-64696-3.
- Jabali, Fu'ad (2003). The Companions of the Prophet: A Study of Geographical Distribution and Political Alignments. Brill. ISBN 978-90-474-0188-9.
- Landau-Tasseron, Ella, ed. (1998). The History of al-Ṭabarī, Volume XXXIX: Biographies of the Prophet's Companions and their Successors: al-Ṭabarī's Supplement to his History. SUNY Series in Near Eastern Studies. Albany, New York: State University of New York Press. ISBN 978-0-7914-2819-1.
- Humphreys, R. Stephen, ed. (1990). The History of al-Ṭabarī, Volume XV: The Crisis of the Early Caliphate: The Reign of ʿUthmān, A.D. 644–656/A.H. 24–35. SUNY Series in Near Eastern Studies. Albany, New York: State University of New York Press. ISBN 978-0-7914-0154-5.
- Gordon, Matthew S.; Robinson, Chase F.; Rowson, Everett K.; Fishbein, Michael, eds. (2018). The Works of Ibn Wādiḥ al-Yaʿqūbī: An English Translation. Vol. 3. Brill. ISBN 978-90-04-36416-5.
- Smith, G. Rex, ed. (1994). The History of al-Ṭabarī, Volume XIV: The Conquest of Iran, A.D. 641–643/A.H. 21–23. SUNY Series in Near Eastern Studies. Albany, New York: State University of New York Press. ISBN 978-0-7914-1293-0.
