= Sahla bint Suhayl =

Sahla bint Suhayl (Arabic: سهلة بنت سهيل) was a sahabiyah of the Islamic prophet Muhammad. She was married to Abu Hudhayfa ibn Utba. They had an adoptive son named Salim mawla Abi Hudhayfa. She was amongst the women who migrated to Abyssinia, a journey which Abu Hudhayfa also undertook. While in Abyssinia she gave birth to Abu Hudhayfa's son, Muhammad ibn Abi Hudhayfa.
