= Qays ibn Sa'd =

Rashidun army leader and companion of Muhammad

Qays ibn Sa'd قيس بن سعد

Governor of Egypt
- In office August 656 – February 657
- Caliph: Ali
- Preceded by: Muhammad ibn Abi Hudhayfa
- Succeeded by: Muhammad ibn Abi Bakr

Personal details
- Born: Medina, Hijaz, Arabia
- Died: 678–679 CE (59 AH) Medina, Umayyad Caliphate
- Spouse: Qurayba bint Abi Quhafa
- Relations: Banu Khazraj (tribe)
- Parent(s): Saʽd ibn ʽUbadah; Fukayha bint Ubayd ibn Dulaym

Military service
- Allegiance: Muhammad (622–632); Rashidun Caliphate (632–661)
- Battles/wars: Under Muhammad; Battle of Badr; Battle of Uhud; Expedition of al-Khabat; Conquest of Mecca; Under Rashidun Caliphate; First Fitna; Battle of Siffin; Battle of Nahrawan

Qays ibn Sa'd ibn Ubadah (Arabic: قيس بن سعد بن عبادة) was a companion of the Islamic prophet Muhammad and a military commander during the expansion of the early Islamic state. A member of the Banu Khazraj, he exercised influence among the Ansar in Medina and acted as a standard-bearer during engagements including the Battle of Badr and the Conquest of Mecca.

During the Rashidun Caliphate, Qays transitioned into senior administrative and military leadership. Under the fourth caliph, Ali ibn Abi Talib, he served as the governor of Egypt and later Adharbayjan. A distinguished military commander during the First Fitna, he served as a senior officer at the Battle of Siffin and the Battle of Nahrawan, where he directed the Medinese contingent and functioned as a primary spokesman for the Ansar within the Iraqi command structure. Following Ali's assassination, Qays supported Ali's son Hasan until the peace treaty with Mu'awiya I, after which he withdrew from public life to reside in Medina during the emergence of the Umayyad Caliphate. He remained in Medina until his death in 678–679 CE (59 AH).

== Birth and early life ==
Qays ibn Sa'd was born in Medina to Sa'd ibn Ubadah and Fukayha bint Ubayd, both belonging to the Banu Khazraj, one of the two primary tribes of the Ansar. His full siblings were Umama and Sadus, and his paternal half-brothers were Sa'id, Muhammad, and Abd al-Rahman, whose mother was Ghaziya bint Sa'd. Following the conversion of his father, Qays was introduced to Muhammad and entered his service.

== Service under Muhammad ==
Qays participated in numerous campaigns under Muhammad and served as a standard-bearer for the Ansar during major engagements, including the Battle of Badr and the Conquest of Mecca. During the entry into Mecca, the primary banner was reassigned away from Qays's father, Sa'd, because Sa'd publicly proclaimed aggressive retribution and a lack of sanctuary for the Quraysh, sparking fears of violent retaliation. While some traditions state that the Prophet directly transferred the command to Qays, others indicate that it was first entrusted to Ali ibn Abi Talib to take the banner from Sa'd before it was ultimately conferred upon Qays. This transfer ensured the banner remained within the Banu Khazraj leadership while effectively de-escalating tensions surrounding Sa'd's retaliatory conduct.

During the Expedition of al-Khabat, Qays managed troop welfare under conditions of extreme famine. As the starving force of 300 men resorted to consuming scavenged vegetation and sea life, Qays repeatedly slaughtered his own riding camels to provide sustenance, persisting despite the initial objections of the expedition's commander. Upon returning to Medina, these actions were reported to Muhammad, who remarked that such generosity was a hallmark of Qays's family.

Beyond his battlefield responsibilities, Qays served in roles requiring direct proximity to the leadership. Hela Ouardi characterizes his role as an aide and "swordsman" (sayyaf) for Muhammad, drawing a functional comparison to a chief of police (sahib al-shurta), a role that necessitated constant proximity to the leadership and direct oversight of internal security within the capital. Concurrently, Qays served as an administrative agent tasked with the collection and distribution of zakāh (alms). Historical records cited in Islamic jurisprudence further note that he performed these financial duties in conjunction with other trusted companions, such as Ubadah ibn al-Samit.

== Provincial governorships and administration ==
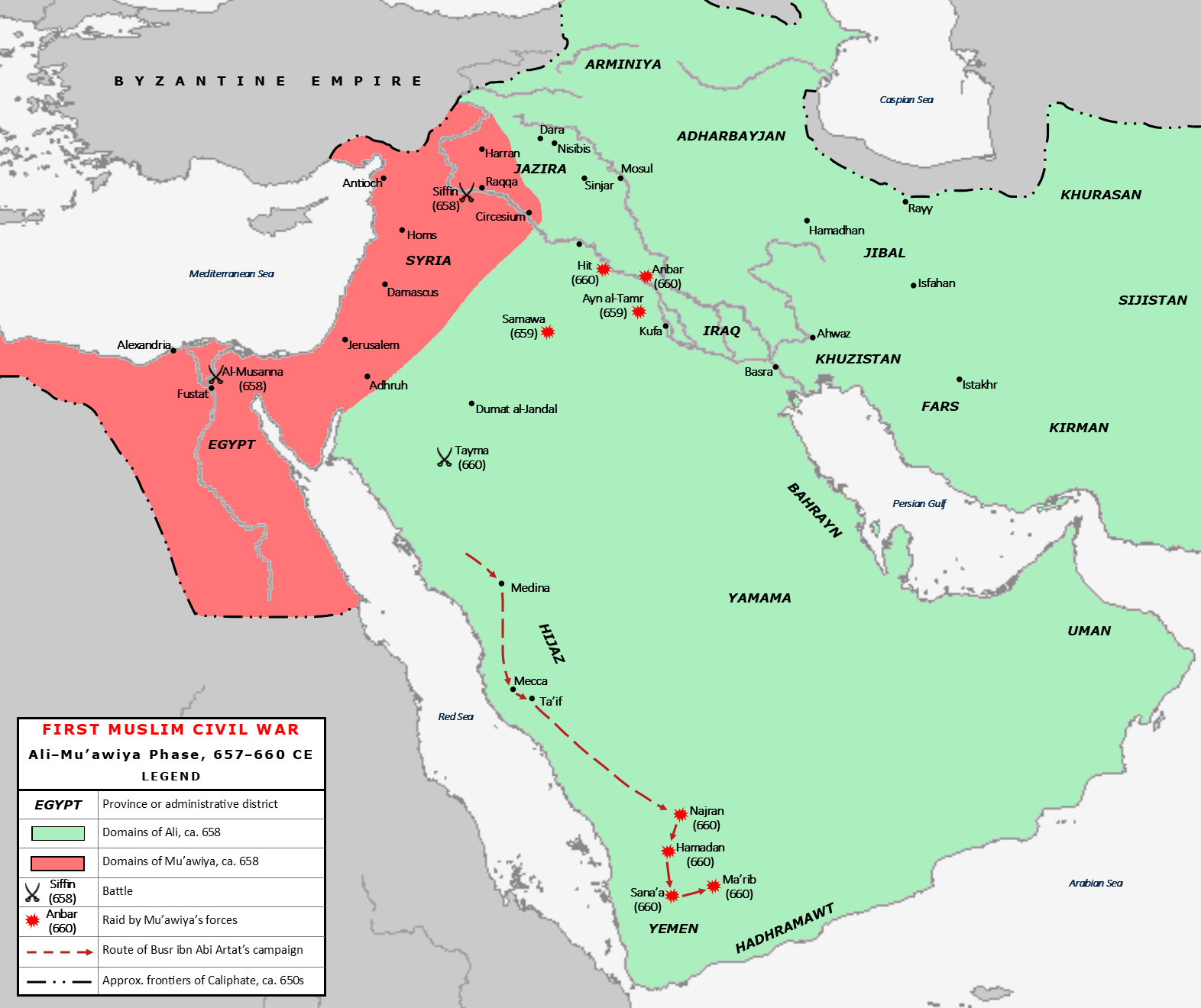
Map of the First Fitna (c. 658 CE). Qays ibn Sa'd served as governor of the regions highlighted here as Egypt (shown in red under Umayyad influence) and Adharbayjan (shown in green under Ali) prior to the political shifts that eventually led to his dismissal and the loss of Egypt.

=== Egypt ===
In August 656, Ali appointed Qays governor of Egypt as a gesture of reconciliation toward the Ansar, a move interpreted by the Quraysh opposition as an attempt to curtail their political influence. Upon arriving in Fustat, Qays secured general allegiance and adopted a pragmatic policy toward the Uthmanids, a political faction opposed to Ali that sought vengeance for the assassination of the previous caliph Uthman. This group was gathered in Kharbita under the leadership of Yazid ibn al-Harith al-Kinani and Qays's kinsman Maslama ibn Mukhallad al-Ansari. By allowing this faction to maintain autonomy in Kharbita in exchange for continued tax payments, Qays successfully preserved administrative stability and ensured revenue flow without triggering an open military conflict.

During his tenure, Qays resisted sustained attempts by Mu'awiya I to subvert his authority. Mu'awiya repeatedly sought to lure Qays into the Syrian camp by leveraging accusations of Ansari complicity in Uthman's assassination and promising future rule over Iraq. Qays rejected these overtures and maintained his position, though he was eventually undermined by a forged letter circulated by Mu'awiya, which falsely suggested Qays had defected. The subsequent political pressure forced Ali to dismiss Qays in February 657, appointing Muhammad ibn Abi Bakr as his successor. According to historian Hugh Kennedy, the leadership change proved a strategic disaster; the subsequent Umayyad conquest of Egypt led by Amr ibn al-As resulted in the loss of the province, leaving Ali's power base in Iraq strategically isolated.

=== Adharbayjan ===
Following his dismissal from Egypt, Qays remained a key administrative and military asset for Ali. Before the final mobilization against Syria, Ali appointed him governor of Adharbayjan with instructions to manage regional security before joining the main army in Kufa. While historical traditions, such as those preserved by al-Zuhri, characterize this appointment as both a reward for his loyalty and a strategic command post, the province played a diminishing role in the conflict after Ali's assassination in 661, as Ali's son Hasan shifted the state's policy toward a negotiated settlement.

== Military commands ==
=== Battle of Siffin ===
During the Battle of Siffin, Ali structured his army into a professional multi-wing formation, with himself in the center commanding the Medinese contingent, which consisted largely of the Ansar. He appointed Qays to command the Basran infantry. On the sixth day of the engagement, Qays engaged in personal combat against Samayfa ibn Nakur (Dhu al-Kala) before both commanders retreated from the field. By the next day, Qays was recognized as one of the three primary leaders of the Iraqi qurra, a politically militant class of warriors and devout scholars, alongside Ammar ibn Yasir and Abd Allah ibn Budayl.

=== Battle of Nahrawan ===
The Kharijites, who had seceded from Ali's army following the arbitration at Siffin, formed a radical splinter faction opposed to his leadership. Ali deployed Qays as his lead diplomat to negotiate with them at al-Mada'in. Qays sought a peaceful resolution, demanding the surrender of those among them guilty of murder and proposing a truce until the conflict with Syria was settled. The Kharijites rejected his overtures, declaring the blood of Ali's supporters lawful. During the negotiations, Qays countered the rebel leader Abd Allah ibn Shajara's demand for a leader of Umar's caliber by asserting that Ali was the only contemporary who met that standard.

When diplomacy failed, the forces engaged at the Battle of Nahrawan. Al-Tabari records that Ali organized his army into a professional multi-wing structure, placing Qays among the senior command. While Hujr ibn Adi and Shabath ibn Rib'i led the right and left wings respectively and Abu Ayyub al-Ansari commanded the cavalry, Qays held command of the Medinese contingent. Numbering between 700 and 800 soldiers, this unit represented the core of the Ansar within the army and underscored Qays's role as their primary representative in both political and military spheres.

=== Under Hasan ibn Ali ===
After Ali was assassinated in 661, Qays ibn Sa'd remained a steadfast supporter of Hasan ibn Ali. He played a key role in urging the Kufans to rally behind Hasan and accompanied him during the early stages of the mobilization against Mu'awiya. Hasan appointed Qays as one of his senior commanders alongside Sa'id ibn Qays, placing them in advisory roles beneath Ubayd Allah ibn Abbas, who led the vanguard. Madelung notes that Hasan's preference for Ubayd Allah reflected his reluctance to be drawn into open battle, despite Qays's reputation as a capable military leader.

As the negotiations between Hasan and Mu'awiya intensified, Qays remained loyal to Hasan. Although he formally pledged allegiance to Mu'awiya in Hasan's presence following the peace agreement, later accounts emphasize the symbolic and reluctant nature of this act. Historian L. Clarke disputes this, asserting that Qays remained steadfast in his refusal to surrender to or compromise with Mu'awiya, even after Ali's assassination and Hasan's treaty with Mu'awiya.

== Personal life and death ==
Qays married Qurayba bint Abi Quhafa, a sister of the first caliph, Abu Bakr. The marriage did not produce any children. Following the peace treaty between Hasan and Mu'awiya, Qays returned to Medina and spent his remaining years in retirement. He died in 59 AH (678–679 CE) during the final years of Mu'awiya's caliphate.

== Bibliography ==
- Madelung, Wilferd (1997). The Succession to Muhammad: A Study of the Early Caliphate. Cambridge University Press. ISBN 0-521-64696-0.
- Wellhausen, J. (1927). The Arab Kingdom and Its Fall. Translated by Weir, M.G. University of Calcutta. OCLC 752790641.
- Khalid, Muhammad (2005). Men Around The Messenger. Kuala Lumpur: Islamic Book Trust. ISBN 983-915473-7.
- Ibn Sa'd, Muhammad (2013). Kitab at-Tabaqat al-Kabir, Volume III: The Companions of Badr. Translated by Aisha Bewley. London: Ta-Ha Publishers. ISBN 978-1842001332.
- ibn Rāshid, Maʿmar (2015). Anthony, Sean W. (ed.). The Expeditions: An Early Biography of Muḥammad. Library of Arabic Literature. Vol. 20. Translated by Anthony, Sean W.; Abdel Haleem, M. A. S. NYU Press. ISBN 978-1479816828. ISSN 2691-9850.
- al-Waqidi, Abu Abd Allah Muhammad ibn Umar (2013). Faizer, Rizwi (ed.). The Life of Muhammad: Al-Waqidi's Kitab al-Maghazi. Routledge Studies in Classical Islam. Translated by Faizer, Rizwi. Routledge. ISBN 978-1136921131.
- Clarke, L. (2001). Shi'ite Heritage: Essays on Classical and Modern Traditions. G - Reference, Information and Interdisciplinary Subjects Series (illustrated ed.). Global Academic Publishing. ISBN 978-1-58684-066-2.
- Kennedy, H. (2016). The Prophet and the Age of the Caliphates: The Islamic Near East from the Sixth to the Eleventh Century. Cambridge: Routledge. ISBN 978-1-138-78761-2.
- Ouardi, Hela (2019). Les Califes maudits: Volume 1 : La déchirure (in French). Albin Michel. ISBN 978-2-226-43398-5.
- Ibn Kathir, Ismāʻīl ibn ʻUmar (1998). The Life of the Prophet Muḥammad: A Translation of Al-Sīra Al-Nabawiyya. Vol. 3. Garnet Publishing. ISBN 978-1859640098.
- Bashier, Zakaria (2015). War and Peace in the Life of the Prophet Muhammad. Kube Publishing Ltd. ISBN 978-0-86-037626-2.
- Rashid, Arssan Mussa (1983). The Role of the Shurta in Early Islam (Ph.D.). University of Edinburgh.
- al-Qaradawi, Yusuf (2011). Fiqh al-Zakah: A Comprehensive Study of Zakah Regulations and Philosophy in the Light of the Qur'an and Sunnah. The Other Press. ISBN 978-967-5062-76-6.
- Ibn Sa'd, Muhammad (1995). Kitab at-Tabaqat al-Kabir, Volume VIII: The Woman of Madina. Translated by Aisha Bewley. London: Ta-Ha Publishers. ISBN 978-1-897940-24-2.
- Hawting, G. R., ed. (1996). The History of al-Ṭabarī, Volume XVII: The First Civil War: From the Battle of Siffīn to the Death of ʿAlī, A.D. 656–661/A.H. 36–40. SUNY Series in Near Eastern Studies. Albany, New York: State University of New York Press. ISBN 978-0-7914-2393-6.
- Fishbein, Michael, ed. (1997). The History of al-Ṭabarī, Volume VIII: The Victory of Islam: Muḥammad at Medina A.D. 626–630/A.H. 5–8. SUNY Series in Near Eastern Studies. Albany, New York: State University of New York Press. ISBN 978-0-7914-3149-8.
