= Umayyad invasions of Egypt (657–658) =

657–658 military campaign against Egypt

- Part of First Fitna
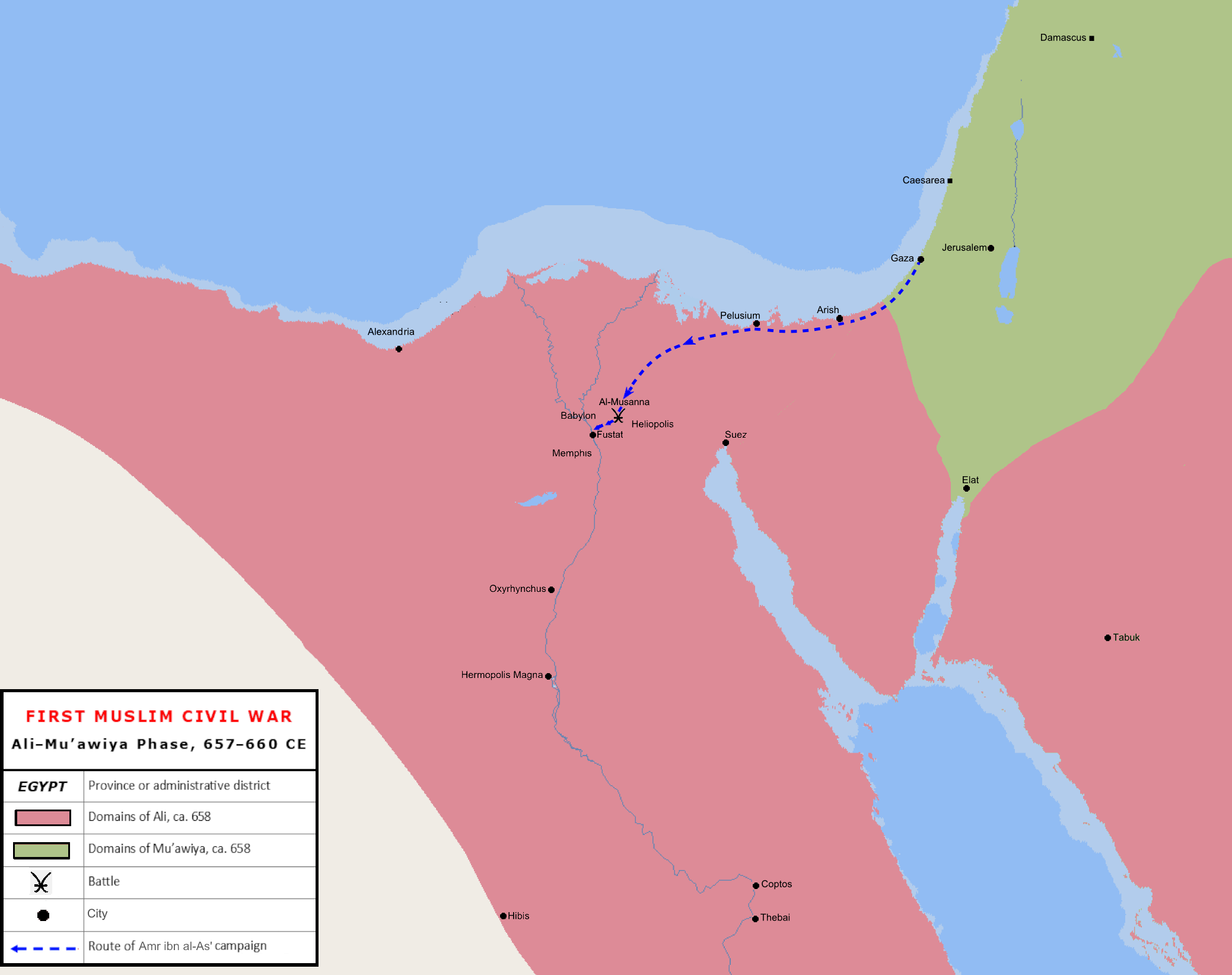
- Route of Amr ibn al-As during the Egyptian campaign Region under the control of Caliph Ali Region under the control of Mu'awiya I
Date	657–658
Location	Egypt
Result	Umayyad victory
Territorial changes	Egypt brought under Umayyad rule

Belligerents
Rashidun Caliphate	Umayyad Syria

Commanders and leaders
Ali ibn Abi Talib; Malik al-Ashtar X Muhammad ibn Abi Bakr (executed); Muhammad ibn Abi Hudhayfa †; Abd al-Rahman ibn Udays (executed); Kinana ibn Bishr al-Tujibi †; Al-Harith ibn Jumhan †; Ibn Mudahim al-Kalbi †	Mu'awiya ibn Abi Sufyan; Amr ibn al-As; Mu'awiya ibn Hudayj; Busr ibn Abi Artat; Abu al-A'war; Maslama ibn Mukhallad; Uqba ibn Amir; Kharija ibn Hudhafa; Yazid ibn al-Harith; Yazid ibn Asad al-Bajali; Sumayr ibn Ka'b

Strength
2,500+	6,000+

The Umayyad invasions of Egypt (657–658) were a series of military expeditions during the First Fitna, initiated by the Umayyad governor of Syria, Mu'awiya ibn Abi Sufyan, to oust the forces and administration of the fourth Rashidun caliph, Ali ibn Abi Talib, from Egypt. Following the assassination of Caliph Uthman in 656, Egypt was initially held by pro-Alid governors, but faced mounting opposition from the local Uthmaniyya, who demanded retribution for the caliph's death.

In 658, Mu'awiya dispatched a Syrian army commanded by Amr ibn al-As to conquer Egypt. After the failure of Alid partisans to hold the region and the death of Ali's commander Malik al-Ashtar, the loyalist defense collapsed at the Battle of al-Musanna. The subsequent Umayyad victory resulted in the execution of Ali's governor, Muhammad ibn Abi Bakr, the reinstatement of Amr to the governorship of Egypt, and the annexation of the province by Mu'awiya. The fall of Egypt served as a decisive turning point in the conflict, crippling the Alid caliphate by depriving it of the vast wealth of the region, and isolating its power base in Iraq.

== Background ==
The political crisis in Egypt was a direct extension of the First Fitna. After the assassination of the third Rashidun caliph, Uthman ibn Affan, Egypt was divided between Alid supporters and a powerful faction of Uthmaniyya (the partisans of Uthman) who demanded retribution for the late caliph's blood.

Initially the province was seized for the Alid cause by Muhammad ibn Abi Hudhayfa and Abd al-Rahman ibn Udays. Following the appointment of Qays ibn Sa'd as governor, both leaders attempted to join Ali's forces in Medina but were intercepted by Mu'awiya near Arish.

The two men were imprisoned together at Jabal al-Jalil but met separate fates. Ibn Udays was executed in 657 while Muhammad ibn Abi Hudhayfa was killed by a Yemenite during a later escape attempt. Subsequently, Qays ibn Sa'd adopted a policy of de-escalation by allowing the Uthmanid opposition based in Kharbita to remain neutral in exchange for peace.

== Fragmentation and Instability ==
The stability established by Qays ended when he was recalled and replaced by Muhammad ibn Abi Bakr in 657. This appointment proved immediately unpopular among the Uthmanids, leading to increased sectarian tension and a lack of popular support for Ali's rule in the region. Unlike his predecessor, Muhammad abandoned the policy of neutrality and issued an ultimatum to the rebels to either pledge allegiance to Ali or depart from Egypt. This demand triggered an active revolt under Mu'awiya ibn Hudayj. Muhammad attempted to suppress the uprising by sending an offensive under Al-Harith ibn Jumhan al-Ju'fi, who was killed in the engagement. A second operation led by Ibn Mudahim al-Kalbi similarly failed to defeat the Uthmanids, leaving the governor's limited forces overstretched. Recognizing the impending collapse of Alid authority in Egypt, Ali dispatched his lieutenant Malik al-Ashtar from Nisibis to take supreme command over the province. However, al-Ashtar was poisoned at Qulzum, an act widely considered to have been instigated by Mu'awiya. The death of al-Ashtar's death was celebrated at Damascus, the Umayyad capital in Syria, and left Muhammad isolated at his post.

== Umayyad intervention and fall of Fustat ==
In mid-658, Mu'awiya ordered a full-scale military intervention to support the Egyptian Uthmanids and annex the province. He dispatched a Syrian force of approximately 6,000 soldiers under the command of Amr ibn al-As, who had been Egypt's conqueror and its first Arab governor. Muhammad ibn Abi Bakr, whose authority had been weakened by failed expeditions against the rebels at Kharbita, was able to muster a loyalist force of only 2,500 men for the defense of the Alid cause. Furthermore, he had incurred criticism from the Yemeni tribes in Egypt, who subsequently abandoned him after they were won over by Amr ibn al-As.

Alongside the Uthmaniyya, who were led by Mu'awiya ibn Hudayj al-Sakuni, the invading Umayyad army was drawn from several military districts in Syria:

- Troops of Jund Dimashq (Damascus) – commanded by Yazid ibn Asad al-Bajali
- Troops of Jund Filastin (Palestine) – commanded by Sumayr ibn Ka'b al-Khath'ami
- Troops of Jund al-Urdunn (Jordan) – commanded by Abu al-A'war al-Sulami

The two forces met at the Battle of al-Musanna, located between Heliopolis and Fustat. Despite a spirited defense by the Alid commander Kinana ibn Bishr, the numerically superior Syrian and Uthmanid coalition swiftly overwhelmed the Egyptian loyalists. Kinana was killed in the heat of the battle, leading to the total collapse of Muhammad's lines. Following the defeat, Muhammad ibn Abi Bakr attempted to flee but was captured and executed by the forces of Mu'awiya ibn Hudayj.

The Umayyad victory resulted in the immediate reinstatement of Amr ibn al-As as governor of the province, bringing Egypt under the control of the Damascus-based coalition. This annexation marked a decisive turning point in the First Fitna, depriving Ali of the region's vast agricultural wealth and tax revenue while securing Mu'awiya's southern flank.

== See also ==
- Battle of the Camel
- Battle of Siffin

== Bibliography ==
- Wellhausen, Julius (1927). The Arab Kingdom and Its Fall. Translated by Margaret Graham Weir. Calcutta: University of Calcutta.
- Madelung, W. (1997). The Succession to Muḥammad: A Study of the Early Caliphate. Cambridge University Press. ISBN 978-0-521-64696-3.
- Muir, William (1891). The Caliphate: Its Rise, Decline, and Fall. Religious Tract Society.
- Muir, William (2025). Annals of the Early Caliphate. From Original Sources. Antigonos Verlag. ISBN 9783563937211.
- Lev, Yaacov (2020). Administration of Justice in Medieval Egypt: From the 7th to the 12th Century. Edinburgh University Press. ISBN 978-1-4744-5926-6.
- Calder, Norman; Mojaddedi, Jawid Ahmad; Rippin, Andrew (2013). Classical Islam: A Sourcebook of Religious Literature. Routledge. ISBN 978-0-415-50507-9.
- Petry, Carl F., ed. (1998). Cambridge History of Egypt, Volume One: Islamic Egypt, 640–1517 : Egypt as a Province in the Islamic Caliphate, 641–868. Cambridge: Cambridge University Press. ISBN 0-521-47137-0.
- Kennedy, H. (2016). The Prophet and the Age of the Caliphates: The Islamic Near East from the Sixth to the Eleventh Century. Cambridge: Routledge. ISBN 978-1-138-78761-2.
- El-Hibri, Tayeb (2010). Parable and Politics in Early Islamic History: The Rashidun Caliphs. New York: Columbia University Press. ISBN 9780231150828.
- Gordon, Matthew S.; Robinson, Chase F.; Rowson, Everett K.; Fishbein, Michael, eds. (2018). The Works of Ibn Wāḍiḥ al-Yaʿqūbī: An English Translation. Vol. 3. Brill. ISBN 978-90-04-36416-5.
