= Mu'awiya ibn Hudayj =

7th-century Arab military commander

Mu'awiya ibn Hudayj معاوية بن حذيج

Governor of Ifriqiya
- In office c. 665–666
- Monarch: Mu'awiya I
- Succeeded by: Uqba ibn Nafi

Personal details
- Died: c. 670 Egypt, Umayyad Caliphate
- Children: Abd al-Rahman
- Parent: Hudayj ibn Jafna (father)
- Relatives: Abdallah ibn Abd al-Rahman (grandson); Muhammad ibn Abd al-Rahman (grandson)

Military service
- Allegiance: Rashidun Caliphate; Umayyad Caliphate
- Years of service: 636–661
- Rank: Soldier (636–661); General (661–665)
- Battles/wars: Muslim conquest of Syria; Battle of the Yarmuk; Muslim conquest of Mesopotamia; Battle of al-Qadisiyyah; Battle of Jalula; Muslim conquest of Egypt; Siege of Dongola; Muslim conquest of the Maghreb; First Fitna; Umayyad invasion of Egypt

Abu Nu'aym Mu'awiya ibn Hudayj ibn Jafna ibn Qatira al-Sakuni al-Tujibi al-Kindi (Arabic: معاوية بن حديج بن جفنة بن قتيرة التجيبي), was a general of the Kinda tribe who served under the first Umayyad caliph Mu'awiya I. Mu'awiya ibn Hudayj participated in the early Muslim conquests against the Byzantines in Syria, Sicily and Ifriqiya, and also against the Sassanids at the Battle of al-Qādisiyyah.

== Biography ==
He first participated in the Battle of the Yarmuk, the Battle of al-Qādisiyyah, and the Battle of Jalula. According to Ibn al-Athir, Mu'awiya ibn Hudayj took part in the Arab conquest of Egypt under Amr ibn al-As, and in the Muslim conquest of the Maghreb under Abd Allah ibn Sa'd. Ibn Hudayj continued to serve under Abd Allah ibn Sa'd during the siege of Dongola, the capital of the Nubian Kingdom of Makuria. During this battle, Ibn Hudayj lost one of his eyes.

He was an adherent of the third Rashidun caliph Uthman ibn Affan, and refused to recognize the accession of the fourth Rashidun caliph Ali ibn Abi Talib following Uthman's assassination in 656. Consequently, he became the leader of the Uthmaniyya in Egypt, and led them in revolt against the Alid governor Muhammad ibn Abi Hudhayfa until 657, when Ibn Abi Hudhayfa was captured and killed by the Umayyad governor of Syria, Mu'awiya ibn Abi Sufyan. As open war broke out between Ali and the Syria-based Umayyads under Mu'awiya, he opposed Ali's appointment of Muhammad ibn Abi Bakr as the new governor of Egypt. In mid-658, he participated in the Umayyad invasion of Egypt under Amr ibn al-As that defeated the Alid loyalists, with Ibn Hudayj personally capturing and executing Ibn Abi Bakr.

In 664–665, he launched a raid on Sicily. Ibn Hudayj was provided with two hundred ships for the invasion by Caliph Mu'awiya. Ibn Hudayj had managed to seized massive spoils of war from this campaign, when he returned to Syria in 665 AD. According to Al-Baladhuri, he was the first Muslim commander to invade Sicily. After the first invasion, Ibn Hudayj continued to raid the island routinely.

In 664–665, he also led 10,000 troops in the area of Sousse. He garrisoned troops in Kairouan and conducted operations against Hadrumetum in the Tacape region (Lesser Syrtis). He was made the governor of Cyrenaica in 669.

Ibn Taghribirdi, Ibn al-Athir and al-Tabari all record a story that Ibn Hudayj blocked the appointment of Ibn Umm al-Hakam as governor of Egypt in 678, although he was long dead by that time.

== See also ==
- Islamic Tripolitania and Cyrenaica
- Umayyad rule in North Africa

== Bibliography ==
- Akram, A. I. (1977). The Muslim Conquest of Egypt and North Africa. Ferozsons. ISBN 978-969-0-00224-2.
- al-Afani, Sayid Hussain (2003). فرسان النهار من الصحابة الأخيار – ج 5 [Knights of the day of the companions good guys] (in Arabic). Riyadh: Dar al Majid Asiri.
- Ibn al-Dabbaj, Abu al-Qasim; al-Khayali, Abdul Majid; ibn Mahmud, Abdurrahman (2005). معالم الإيمان في معرفة أهل القيروان / Volumes 1–2 [Signs of faith in the knowledge of the people of Kairouan] (Professor, Doctorate) (in Arabic). Beirut, Lebanon: Dar al Kotob al Ilmiyah. ISBN 9782745144850.
- Kennedy, Hugh (1998). "Egypt as a province in the Islamic caliphate, 641–868". In Petry, Carl F. (ed.). Cambridge History of Egypt, Volume One: Islamic Egypt, 640–1517. Cambridge: Cambridge University Press. pp. 62–85. ISBN 0-521-47137-0.
- Bosworth, C. E.; van Donzel, E. & Pellat, Ch., eds. (1991). "Maslama b. Mukhallad". The Encyclopaedia of Islam, Second Edition. Volume VI: Mahk–Mid. Leiden: E. J. Brill. p. 740. ISBN 978-90-04-08112-3.
- Muḥammad Lamīlam, ʻAbd al-ʻAzīz (1985). حسان ابن النعمان الغساني ودوره في فتح بلاد المغرب [Hassan Ibn al-Nu'man al-Ghassani and his role in the conquest of the Maghreb] (Ebook) (in Arabic).
- Pellat, Charles (1993). "Muʿāwiya b. Ḥudaydj". In Bosworth, C. E.; van Donzel, E.; Heinrichs, W. P. & Pellat, Ch. (eds.). The Encyclopaedia of Islam, Second Edition. Volume VII: Mif–Naz. Leiden: E. J. Brill. p. 269. ISBN 978-90-04-09419-2.
