= Election of Ali to the caliphate =

Appointment of the fourth Rashidun Caliph

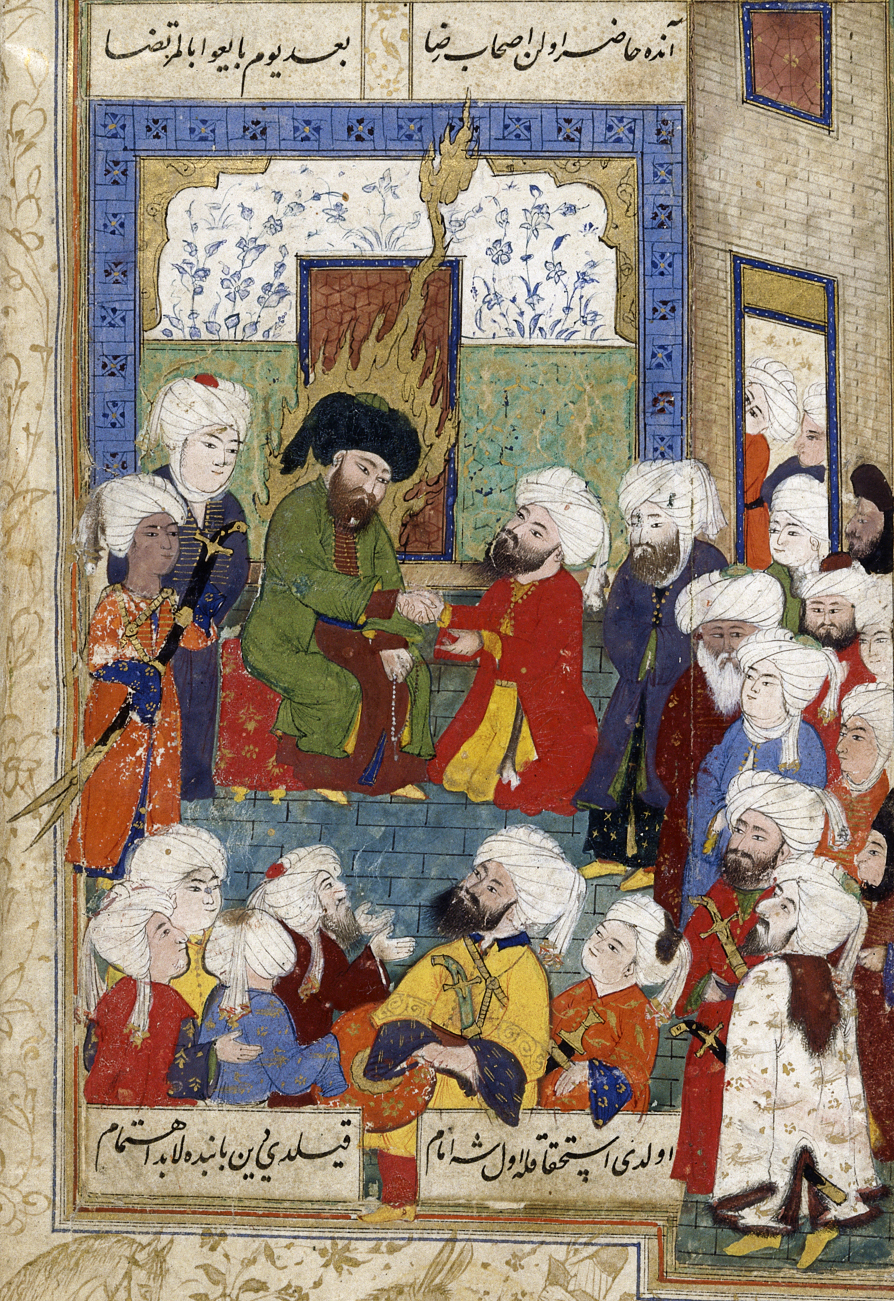
- Allegiance is given to Ali, electing him as caliph, following the Assassination of Uthman (from an Ottoman manuscript of the late 16th/17th century)
- Date: June 656
- Location: Medina, Rashidun Caliphate
- Participants: Ali ibn Abi Talib
- Outcome: Ali is elected as the fourth Rashidun Caliph

Ali ibn Abi Talib became the fourth caliph of the Rashidun Caliphate in 656 CE, following the assassination of the third caliph, Uthman in Medina. Uthman was killed by provincial rebels who had grievances about injustice and corruption. Ali, a cousin and son-in-law of the Islamic prophet Muhammad, was elected by the rebels, the Ansar (early Medinan Muslims), and the Muhajirun (early Meccan Muslims). While the election of Ali faced little initial opposition, his support remained limited among the Quraysh, as some of its members aspired to the caliphate themselves. The Umayyads (Uthman's kinsmen), and some other opponents consequently left Medina, with some repudiating their oaths of allegiance to Ali, and soon rebelled against him.

== Background ==
=== Opposition to Uthman ===
Ali frequently accused the third caliph Uthman of deviating from the Quran and the Sunnah, and he was joined in this criticism by most of the senior companions. Uthman was also widely accused of nepotism, corruption, and injustice, and Ali is known to have protested his conduct, including his lavish gifts for his kinsmen. Ali also protected outspoken companions, such as Abu Dharr and Ammar, against the wrath of the caliph. Ali appears in early sources as a restraining influence on Uthman without directly opposing him. Some supporters of Ali were part of the opposition to Uthman, joined in their efforts by Talha and Zubayr, who were both companions of Muhammad, and by his widow Aisha. Among the supporters of Ali were Malik al-Ashtar (d. 657) and other religiously-learned qurra (lit. 'Quran readers'). These wanted to see Ali as the next caliph, though there is no evidence that he communicated or coordinated with them. Ali is also said to have rejected the requests to lead the rebels, although he might have sympathized with their grievances, and was thus considered a natural focus for the opposition, at least morally. It is also likely that some companions supported the protests with the hope of either deposing Uthman, or changing his policies, thus underestimating the severity of the opposition to Uthman.

=== Assassination of Uthman ===
As their grievances mounted, discontented groups from provinces began arriving in Medina in 35/656. On their first attempt, the Egyptian opposition sought the advice of Ali, who urged them to send a delegation to negotiate with Uthman, unlike Talha and Ammar, who might have encouraged the Egyptians to advance on the town. Ali similarly asked the Iraqi opposition to avoid violence, which was heeded. He also acted as a mediator between Uthman and the provincial dissidents more than once to address their economical and political grievances. In particular, he negotiated and guaranteed on behalf of Uthman the promises that persuaded the rebels to return home and ended the first siege. Ali then urged Uthman to publicly repent, which he did. The caliph soon retracted his statement, however, possibly because his secretary Marwan convinced him that repentance would only embolden the opposition. On their way back home, some Egyptian rebels intercepted an official letter ordering their punishment. They now returned to Medina and laid siege to Uthman's residence for a second time, demanding that he abdicates. The caliph refused and claimed he was unaware of the letter, for which Marwan is often blamed in the early sources. Ali and another companion sided with Uthman about the letter, and suspected Marwan, while a report by the Sunni al-Baladhuri (d. 892) suggests that the caliph accused Ali of forging the letter. This is likely when Ali refused to further intercede for Uthman. That Ali was behind the letter is also the opinion of Leone Caetani (d. 1935). Giorgio Levi della Vida (d. 1967) is unsure, while Wilferd Madelung strongly rejects the accusation, saying that it "stretches the imagination" in the absence of any evidence. In turn, he accuses Marwan, the bellicose secretary of Uthman, while Hugh N. Kennedy holds Uthman responsible for the letter. The caliph was assassinated soon afterward in the final days of 35 AH (June 656) by the Egyptian rebels during a raid on his residence in Medina.

=== Role of Ali in the assassination ===
Ali played no role in the deadly attack, and his son Hasan was injured while guarding Uthman's besieged residence at the request of Ali. He also convinced the rebels not to prevent the delivery of water to Uthman's house during the siege. Beyond this, historians disagree about his measures to protect the third caliph. Ali is represented by al-Tabari (d. 923) as an honest negotiator genuinely concerned for Uthman. Husain M. Jafri (d. 2019) and Madelung highlight multiple attempts by Ali for reconciliation, and Martin Hinds (d. 1988) believes that Ali could not have done anything more for Uthman. Reza Shah-Kazemi points to Ali's "constructive criticism" of Uthman and his opposition to violence, while Moojan Momen writes that Ali mediated between Uthman and the rebels, urging the former to alter his policies and refusing the requests from the latter to lead them. This is similar to the view of John McHugo, who adds that Ali withdrew in frustration when his peace efforts where thwarted by Marwan. Fred Donner and Robert Gleave suggest that Ali was the immediate beneficiary of Uthman's death. This is challenged by Madelung, who argues that Aisha would have not actively opposed Uthman if Ali had been the prime mover of the rebellion and its future beneficiary. He and others observe the hostility of Aisha toward Ali, which resurfaced immediately after his accession in the Battle of the Camel (656). Laura Veccia Vaglieri (d. 1989) notes that Ali refused to lead the rebellion but sympathized with them and possibly agreed with their calls for abdication. Hossein Nasr and Asma Afsaruddin, Levi della Vida, and Julius Wellhausen (d. 1918) believe that Ali remained neutral, while Caetani labels Ali as the chief culprit in the murder of Uthman, even though the evidence suggests otherwise. Mahmoud M. Ayoub (d. 2021) notes the often pro-Umayyad stance of the Western classical orientalists, with the exception of Madelung.

=== Ali and retribution for Uthman ===
Ali was openly critical of the conduct of Uthman, though he generally neither justified his violent death nor condemned the killers. While he did not condone the assassination, Ali probably held Uthman responsible through his injustice for the protests which led to his death, a view for which Ismail Poonawala cites Waq'at Siffin. Madelung sides with this judgement of Ali from a judicial point of view, saying that Uthman probably did not sanction the murder of Niyar ibn Iyad al-Aslami, which triggered the deadly raid on his residence, but he obstructed justice by preventing an investigation into the murder, fearing that his aide Marwan was behind it. Still, in his letters to Mu'awiya (r. 661–680) and elsewhere, Ali insisted that he would bring the murderers to justice in due course, probably after establishing his authority. Quoting the Shia al-Ya'qubi (d. 897-8) and Ibn A'tham al-Kufi, Ayoub suggests that a mob from various tribes murdered Uthman and that Ali could have not punished them without risking widespread tribal conflict, even if he could identify them. Here, Farhad Daftary says that the actual murderers soon fled Medina after the assassination, a view for which Jafri cites al-Tabari. Closely associated with Ali was Malik al-Ashtar, a leader of the qurra, who had led the Kufan delegation against Uthman, even though they heeded Ali's call for nonviolence, and did not participate in the siege of Uthman's residence. A leading Egyptian rebel with links to Ali was his stepson, Muhammad ibn Abi Bakr, who was allegedly among those who killed Uthman. Some authors have rejected this accusation, though most seem to agree that Muhammad visited Uthman shortly before his death and rebuked him for his conduct. These two men and some other supporters of Ali were implicated by Mu'awiya in the assassination of Uthman. As such, some authors suggest that Ali was unwilling or unable to punish these individuals. The revenge for Uthman soon became the pretext for two revolts against Ali.

== Support ==
In the aftermath of the assassination, the potential candidates for the caliphate were Ali and Talha, though some suggest that Talha lacked any popular support, and that Ali was thus the obvious choice. After the assassination of Uthman, his tribesmen (the Umayyads) fled Medina, and the rebels and Medinans thus controlled the city. While Talha may have enjoyed some support among the Egyptian rebels, Ali was preferred by most of the Ansar (early Medinan Muslims) and the Iraqi rebels, who had earlier heeded Ali's call against violence. Alternatively, a report by al-Tabari suggests that the Basran and Kufan opposition supported Talha and Zubayr, respectively. After the assassination, the report continues, both groups supported Ali. Poonawala, Moojan Momen, Jafri, Donner, and Sean Anthony add the majority of the Muhajirun (early Meccan Muslims) to the above list of Ali's supporters. The key tribal chiefs also favored Ali at the time, writes Ira M. Lapidus.

== Reluctance of Ali ==
The caliphate was offered by these groups to Ali, who was initially reluctant to accept it, saying that he preferred to be a minister (wazir). Reza Aslan attributes this reluctance to the polarizing impact of the assassination on the community, while Will Durant (d. 1981) writes, "[Ali] shrank from drama in which religion had been displaced by politics, and devotion by intrigue." For Jafri, Ali must have been wary of implicating himself in Uthman's regicide by becoming the next caliph. For Veccia Vaglieri, however, that Ali allowed himself to be nominated by the rebels was an error, because it left him exposed to accusations of complicity in the assassination. Alternatively, M.A. Shaban and Anthony believe that Ali stepped in to prevent chaos and fill the power vacuum created by the regicide. The opinion of Ayoub is close. Soon after, possibly when it became clear that he enjoyed popular support, Ali accepted the caliphate, demanding a public pledge at the mosque, according to al-Tabari and al-Baladhuri. Shah-Kazemi and Jafri maintain that Ali was compelled by popular pressure to accede, with the latter author presenting as evidence an address in Nahj al-balagha, attributed to Ali at the Battle of the Camel.

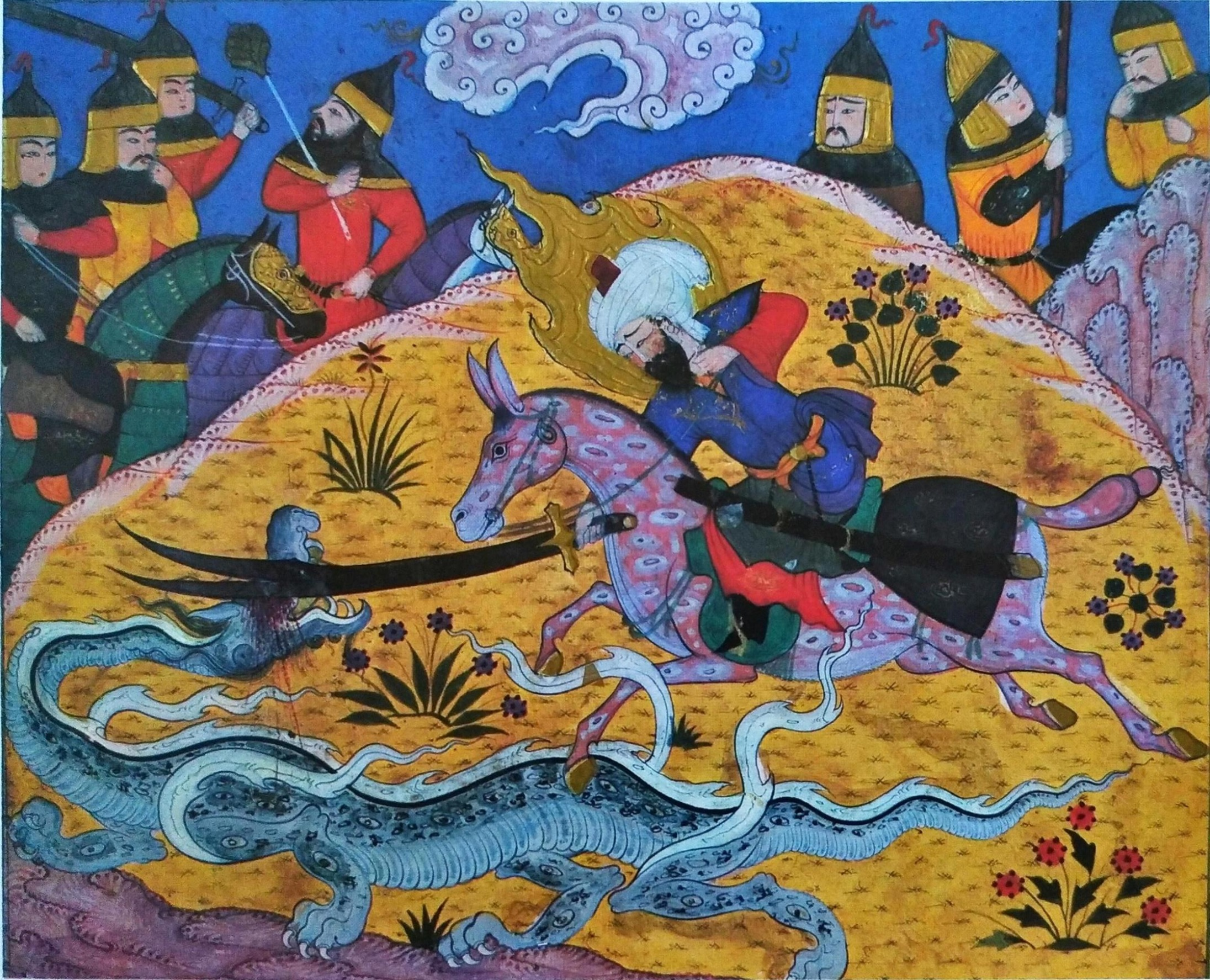
A Persian miniature from Khawran Namah depicts Ali killing a dragon with his sword Zulfiqar.

== Pledges ==
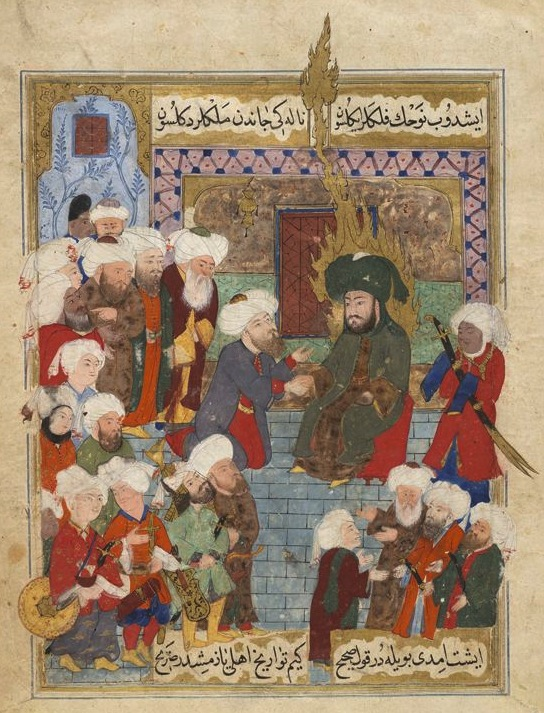
Ali receiving the Bay'ah, folio from a manuscript by Ottoman Sufi writer and poet Lāmiʿī, late 16th century

Ali received the public pledge of allegiance in the Prophet's Mosque in Medina, possibly the day after Uthman's murder, though Poonawala and a report by al-Tabari place the ceremony several days later. It appears that Ali personally did not force anyone for pledge. Among others, Sa'd ibn Abi Waqqas, Abd-Allah ibn Umar, and Usama ibn Zayd refused to give their oaths, though the case of Usama is challenged by Madelung who concludes that he pledged allegiance to Ali but did not fight in his battles. To this list Ayoub adds Sa'id ibn al-As, al-Walid ibn Uqba, and Marwan, suggesting that these three withheld their pledge because of their personal grudges against Ali. The Shia scholar Muhammad H. Tabatabai (d. 1981) further adds Amr ibn al-As, Busr ibn Abi Artat, Samura ibn Jundab, and al-Mughira, claiming that those opposed to Ali are often guilty in the historical sources of religious transgressions. On the whole, Madelung suggests that there is less evidence for any violence here than in the case of the first caliph Abu Bakr (r. 632–634), even though many broke with Ali later, claiming that they had pledged under duress. At the same time, that the majority favored Ali in Medina might have created an intimidating atmosphere for those opposed to him. McHugo suggests that Malik al-Ashtar and some others may have contributed to this atmosphere, probably without the approval of Ali.

=== Talha and Zubayr ===
Talha and Zubayr, both companions of Muhammad with ambitions for the high office, voluntarily gave their pledges to Ali but later broke them, although some early sources say that they pledged under duress from the rebels. Ibn Abi Shayba (d. 849) writes that Talha told some in Basra that he pledged to Ali with a sword over his head in a walled garden, and Hasan al-Basri (d. 728) too said that he saw Talha and Zubayr pledging to Ali with a sword over their head in a walled garden. Alternatively, a report by the Sunni al-Baladhuri implies that Talha voluntarily paid his allegiance to Ali, while other reports by Ibn Sa'd (d. 845), al-Tabari, al-Ya'qubi (d. 897-8), al-Kufi (ninth century), and Ibn Abd Rabbih (d. 940) place Talha and Zubayr among the first who (voluntarily) pledged to Ali. Laura Veccia Vaglieri (d. 1989) views the claims about coercion as an invented justification for the later violation of the pacts made by Talha and Zubayr. Gleave similarly dismisses the (Sunni) reports that Talha and Zubayr did not pledge or did so under duress, saying that these reports reflect their authors' attempts to provide a fuller context for their subsequent rebellion against Ali in the Battle of the Camel. Madelung argues that the election of Ali could have not happened without the pledge of Talha, as Ali's main rival, but he also suggests that Talha did not come to the ceremony voluntarily and was dragged there by al-Ashtar. Alternatively, Hamid Mavani refers to a letter in Nahj al-balagha where Ali rebukes Talha and Zubayr before the Battle of the Camel for breaking their oaths after voluntarily offering them. Madelung also dismisses as legendary the report by al-Tabari about Zubayr's refusal to pledge.

As for the motives of Talha and Zubayr, the duo revolted after Ali refused to grant them favors. In particular, Ali did not offer the two any posts in his government, specifically the governorships of Basra and Kufa. There is, however, one report by al-Ya'qubi where Ali offered the governorship of Yemen to Talha and the rule of al-Yamama and Bahrain to Zubayr, but the two asked for even more. For the Shia Muhammad H. Tabatabai (d. 1981), the equal distribution of the treasury funds among Muslims by Ali antagonized Talha and Zubayr, while Hassan Abbas suggests that the two jumped ship when Ali began to reverse the excessive entitlements of the ruling elite during the caliphate of Uthman, under whom Talha and Zubayr had amassed considerable wealth.

== Legitimacy ==
Hugh N. Kennedy and Veccia Vaglieri write that the election of Ali faced little opposition, and this is also implied by Shaban. Jafri and Momen further suggest that Ali was elected by a near-consensus, adding that he was the only popularly-elected caliph in Muslim history. The latter part is also echoed by Ayoub. In reality, even though underprivileged groups rallied around Ali, he had limited support among the powerful Quraysh, some of whom aspired to the title of caliph. Within the Quraysh, Madelung identifies two camps opposed to Ali: the Umayyads, who believed that the caliphate was their right after Uthman, and those who wished to restore the caliphate of Quraysh on the same principles laid by Abu Bakr (r. 632–634) and Umar (r. 634–644) (rather than the caliphate of Muhammad's clan, the Banu Hashim). Madelung considers the latter group as the majority within the Quraysh. Kennedy similarly writes that the Quraysh challenged Ali to preserve the status of their tribe, while Jafri suggests that the Meccan elites were threatened by the ascetic Ali who represented the Ansar and the lower classes of the society. Ali was also vocal about the divine and exclusive right of Muhammad's kin to succeed him, which would have jeopardized the future ambitions of other Qurayshites for leadership.

=== Exodus ===
The Umayyads fled Medina after the assassination of Uthman, notable among them Marwan. Some Qurayshite figures also left Medina without paying allegiance to Ali or after breaking their oaths. Most of them gathered in Mecca, though some made their way to Damascus. In particular, Talha and Zubayr left Medina on the pretext of performing the umrah (lesser pilgrimage). Muhammad's widow Aisha was already in Mecca, having left Medina earlier ostensibly for the umrah, despite the pleas of Uthman, who believed her presence in Medina would restrain the rebels from attack. After learning about the accession of Ali, she began to mobilize the rebel party in favor of her close relatives, Talha and Zubayr. She did so ostensibly to seek justice for Uthman, although some have questioned her motives because she had earlier actively opposed Uthman.

=== Ali's views ===
Listing multiple pieces of evidence from Nahj al-balagha and other sources, Mavani argues that Ali saw the general pledge of allegiance as a pivotal component in the legitimacy of his caliphate, and thus distinguished between his election and that of the first caliph Abu Bakr: In the words of Ali and the second caliph Umar, the caliphate of Abu Bakr was decided hastily by a small shura (council), whereas Ali emphasized the general public's endorsement of his caliphate. Some authors maintain that Ali unequivocally viewed himself as the most qualified person to lead the Muslim community after Muhammad by virtue of his merits and his kinship with Muhammad. Mavani, Madelung, and Shah-Kazemi add that Ali further considered himself as the designated successor of Muhammad through a divine decree at the Ghadir Khumm. Mavani also speculates that Ali would have not sought the title of caliph had Muslims withheld their support. However, when the Muslim community favored him, suggests Madelung, Ali no longer considered the caliphate as his right, but also as his duty.

== First acts ==
Ali acceded to the caliphate in a difficult period, inheriting a troubled state of affairs. At the time of the assassination, the key governorships were distributed among the tribesmen of Uthman, the Umayyads, the late conversion of most of whom to Islam might have suggested expediency to Ali and the Ansar. Ibn Abbas and al-Mughira advised Ali to initially confirm these governors, in order to consolidate his caliphate, even though some of them were unpopular. Ali rejected this and replaced nearly all the governors who had served Uthman, saying that the likes of those men should not be appointed to any office. The only exemption was Abu Musa al-Ash'ari, a companion of Muhammad elected in Kufa by the rebels.

In this and other decisions, Ali was driven by his sense of religious mission, suggests Madelung, while Poonawala writes that Ali changed the governors to please the rebels. Donner has a similar view to Madelung and Shah-Kazemi maintains that justice was the key principle that molded Ali's policies in all domains. Even so, Madelung views this decision of Ali as politically naive. His view is in turn rejected by Ali Bahramian, who suggests that replacing the governors was the only available course of action, both on principle and in practice. He writes that injustice was the main grievance of the provincial rebels and they would have turned against Ali had he confirmed Uthman's governors. Ayoub says that the idealism of Ali in time became an example for the pious but also led to war in the short term. He adds that political flexibility was a quality of Muhammad, absent in Ali. In contrast, Tabatabai asserts that Islam never allows for compromising on a just cause, quoting verse 68:9, "They wish that thou might compromise and that they might compromise." To support his view, Tabatabai notes that Muhammad repeatedly rejected calls for peace from his enemies in return for leaving their gods alone. Shah-Kazemi too challenges the view of Ayoub, saying that Muhammad appointed some of his erstwhile enemies to leadership positions to give them an opportunity to prove their conversion to Islam, without compromising his principles. In contrast, confirming those whom Ali dismissed would have been tantamount to overlooking their corruption and undermining the moral basis of his caliphate. Among the incumbent governors was Uthman's cousin Mu'awiya, who soon launched a campaign against Ali on the pretext of vengeance for Uthman.

Ali also distributed the treasury funds equally among Muslims, which might have also been the method of Muhammad. Shaban suggests that this change made Ali the rallying point of underprivileged groups. In doing so, Ayoub suggests that Ali wanted to abolish the social hierarchies established by Umar and Uthman. As his official designation, Ali adopted the title amir al-mu'minin (lit. 'commander of the faithful'), which was also used earlier by Umar. He rejected the title of caliph, which he perhaps found to be depreciated and tainted by his predecessor.

== Sources ==
- Veccia Vaglieri, Laura (1970). "The Patriarchal and Umayyad Caliphates". In Holt, Peter M.; Lambton, Ann K.S.; Lewis, Bernard (eds.). The Cambridge History of Islam. Vol. 1. Cambridge University Press. pp. 57–103.
- Veccia Vaglieri, L. (2012a). "ʿAlī b. Abī Ṭālib". In Bearman, P.; Bianquis, Th.; Bosworth, C.E.; van Donzel, E.; Heinrichs, W.P. (eds.). Encyclopaedia of Islam (Second ed.). doi:10.1163/1573-3912_islam_COM_0046.
- Veccia Vaglieri, L. (2012b). "al-D̲j̲amal". In Bearman, P.; Bianquis, Th.; Bosworth, C.E.; van Donzel, E.; Heinrichs, W.P. (eds.). Encyclopaedia of Islam (Second ed.). doi:10.1163/1573-3912_islam_SIM_1962.
- Madelung, Wilferd (1997). The Succession to Muhammad: A Study of the Early Caliphate. Cambridge University Press. ISBN 0-521-64696-0.
- Mavani, Hamid (2013). Religious Authority and Political Thought in Twelver Shi'ism: From Ali to Post-Khomeini. Routledge. ISBN 9780415624404.
- Momen, Moojan (1985). An Introduction to Shi'i Islam. Yale University Press. ISBN 9780853982005.
- Kennedy, Hugh (2015). The Prophet and the Age of the Caliphates: The Islamic Near East from the Sixth to the Eleventh Century. Routledge.
- Jafri, S.H.M (1979). Origins and Early Development of Shia Islam. London: Longman.
- Donner, Fred M. (2010). Muhammad and the Believers: At the Origins of Islam. Harvard University Press. ISBN 9780674064140.
- Durant, Will (1950). The Story of Civilization: The Age of Faith. New York: Simon and Schuster. p. 191.
- Shaban, M.A. (1971). Islamic History: A New Interpretation. Vol. 1. Cambridge University Press. ISBN 9780521291316.
- Tabatabai, Sayyid Mohammad Hosayn (1975). Shi'ite Islam. Translated by Sayyid Hossein Nasr. State University of New York Press. ISBN 0-87395-390-8.
- McHugo, John (2018). A Concise History of Sunnis and Shi'is. Georgetown University Press. ISBN 9781626165885.
- Shah-Kazemi, Reza (2015). "Imam Ali". In Daftary, Farhad; Sajoo, Amyn; Jiwa, Shainool (eds.). The Shi'i World: Pathways in Tradition and Modernity. Bloomsbury Publishing. ISBN 9780857727633.
- Nasr, Seyyed Hossein; Afsaruddin, Asma (2021). "Ali". Encyclopedia Britannica.
- Hinds, Martin (1972). "The Murder of the Caliph'Uthman". International Journal of Middle East Studies. 3 (4): 450–69. doi:10.1017/S0020743800025216. S2CID 159763369.
- Aslan, Reza (2011). No god but God: The Origins, Evolution, and Future of Islam. Random House. ISBN 9780812982442.
- Anthony, Sean W. (2013). "'Ali b. Abi Talib (ca. 599-661)". In Bowering, Gerhard (ed.). The Princeton encyclopedia of Islamic political thought. Princeton University Press. pp. 30–2. ISBN 9780691134840.
- Glassé, Cyril, ed. (2003). "Shi'ism". The new encyclopedia of Islam. AltaMira Press. pp. 422–8. ISBN 9780759101890.
- Poonawala, I.K. (1982). "ʿALĪ B. ABĪ ṬĀLEB I. Life". Encyclopaedia Iranica (Online ed.).
- Lapidus, Ira M. (2014). A History of Islamic Societies. Cambridge University Press. ISBN 9780521514309.
- Dakake, Maria Massi (2012). The Charismatic Community: Shi'ite Identity in Early Islam. State University of New York Press. ISBN 9780791480342.
- Wellhausen, Julius (1927). The Arab Kingdom and Its Fall. Translated by Weir, Margaret G. University of Calcutta.
- Levi Della Vida, G.; Khoury, R.G. (2012). "ʿUt̲h̲mān b. ʿAffān". In Bearman, P.; Bianquis, Th.; Bosworth, C.E.; van Donzel, E.; Heinrichs, W.P. (eds.). Encyclopaedia of Islam (Second ed.). doi:10.1163/1573-3912_islam_COM_1315.
- Shah-Kazemi, Reza (2022). Imam 'Ali: Concise History, Timeless Mystery. I.B. Tauris. ISBN 9781784539368.
- Ayoub, Mahmoud M. (2014). The Crisis of Muslim History: Religion and Politics in Early Islam. Oneworld Publications. ISBN 9781780746746.
- Bahramian, Ali (2015). "ʿAlī b. Abī Ṭālib 3. Caliphate". In Daftary, Farhad (ed.). Encyclopaedia Islamica. doi:10.1163/1875-9831_isla_COM_0252.
- Abbas, Hassan (2021). The Prophet's Heir: The Life of Ali ibn Abi Talib. Yale University Press. ISBN 9780300252057.
- Keaney, Heather N. (2021). 'Uthman ibn 'Affan: Legend or Liability?. Oneworld Publications. ISBN 9781786076984.
- Esposito, John L. (1992). Islam: The Straight Path. Oxford University Press. ISBN 9780195074727.
- Daftary, Farhad (2013). A History of Shi'i Islam. I.B. Tauris. ISBN 9780755608669.
- Adamec, Ludwig W. (2016). Historical Dictionary of Islam. Rowman & Littlefield. ISBN 9781442277243.
- Petersen, Erling L. (2008) [1964]. Ali and Mu'awiya in Early Arabic Tradition: Studies on the Genesis and Growth of Islamic Historical Writing Until the End of the Ninth Century. Translated by Christensen, P. Lampe. Acls History E Book Project. ISBN 9781597404716.
- Amir-Moezzi, Mohammad Ali (2016). Divine Guide in Early Shi'ism, The: The Sources of Esotericism in Islam. Translated by Streight, David. State University of New York Press. ISBN 9780791494790.
- Nasr, S.H.; Dagli, C.K.; Dakake, M.M.; Lumbard, J.E.B.; Rustom, M., eds. (2015). The Study Quran: A New Translation and Commentary. Harper Collins. ISBN 9780062227621.
- Gleave, Robert M. (2008). "ʿAlī b. Abī Ṭālib". In Fleet, Kate; Krämer, Gudrun; Matringe, Denis; Nawas, John; Rowson, Everett (eds.). Encyclopaedia of Islam (Third ed.). doi:10.1163/1573-3912_ei3_COM_26324.
