= Habib ibn Maslama al-Fihri =

Arab military commander (c. 617–c. 662)

Habib ibn Maslama al-Fihri حبيب بن مسلمة الفهري
- Born: 617; Mecca, Hejaz, Arabia
- Died: 662 (aged 44–45); Damascus, Syria
- Spouse: 3
- Children: 2
- Father: Maslama al-Fihrī
- Military career
- Allegiance: Rashidun Caliphate (634–657); Mu'awiya (657–661); Umayyad Caliphate (661–662)
- Rank: General
- Conflicts: Muslim conquest of Syria; Battle of the Yarmuk; Siege of Emesa; Siege of Caesarea Maritima; Muslim conquest of Armenia; First Fitna; Battle of Siffin

Ḥabīb ibn Maslama al-Fihrī (Arabic: حبيب بن مسلمة الفهري; c. 617–662) was an Arab general during the early Muslim conquests. Habib fought against the Byzantines in the Muslim conquest of Syria and in Upper Mesopotamia, where he later served as governor. He took part in an expedition against Byzantine-controlled Armenia and was appointed governor of the conquered Armenian territories. Habib was then recalled from Armenia to fight the Byzantines in northern Syria.

During the First Fitna, he served under the command of Mu'awiya ibn Abi Sufyan, the Umayyad governor of Syria, and fought with distinction at the Battle of Siffin. After Mu'awiya became caliph, Habib was appointed governor of Armenia and Adharbayjan.

== Life ==
=== Origin and career under Umar ===
Born in Mecca c. 617, Habib was a member of the Muharib ibn Fihr clan of the Quraysh tribe (to which Muhammad had belonged). He fought with distinction in the Muslim conquest of Syria and Upper Mesopotamia against the Byzantines. He led a cavalry squadron in the Battle of the Yarmuk, and Caliph Umar (r. 634–644) appointed him first as governor of Homs and later of Upper Mesopotamia.

His record in the battles against the Byzantines led to his nickname of Ḥabīb al-Rūm ("Habib of the Byzantines", which if translated fully results in the rather ironic "The Beloved One of the Byzantines"). Caliph Umar is said to have been impressed by him, and to have opened the treasury (or the arsenal, according to other accounts) for him to take what he wished; Habib only took a set of weapons, leaving the treasury untouched.

=== Career under Uthman ===
Caliph Uthman (r. 644–656) instructed his governor of Syria, Mu'awiya ibn Abi Sufyan, to send him in an expedition to Byzantine-controlled Armenia—although some sources insist that the Caliph commissioned Habib directly. Muslim sources place this event right after Uthman's accession in 644, but Byzantine and Armenian sources place it ten years later, in 653/654. The campaign was a great success for the Arabs: Habib's forces took Melitene and defeated the Byzantine governor of Armenia, Maurianos, in a night attack near Dvin. According to the Armenian historian Sebeos, the Arabs pursued the defeated Byzantine commander as far as Caucasian Iberia or even the Black Sea, and took Trapezus and Theodosiopolis.

The treaties of capitulation for Dvin and Tiflis that he concluded at that time are preserved by the literary sources. During this expedition, he is said to have brought one of his wives, Umm Abdallah bint Yazid al-Kalbiyya, who was valiant and fearless. Before the night assault on Maurianos' camp, he is reported to have asked her where he would find her after the battle, and she replied "either in Maurianos' tent, or in paradise". When Habib reached the Byzantine commander's tent, she was already there.

Habib was briefly appointed governor of the conquered Armenian territories, but was then recalled to take command of the borderlands with the Byzantine Empire in northern Syria, centred on Qinnasrin, from where he was engaged in fighting against the Mardaites and the Byzantines.

=== First Fitna and career under Mu'awiya ===
When Uthman was besieged at his home in Medina by provincial rebels, Mu'awiya sent Habib with 4,000 Syrian troops to rescue him, but his vanguard had only reached Wadi al-Qura in the northern Hejaz when news of Uthman's murder reached him. However, stories of Uthman's requesting aid against fellow Muslims may be a later invention. In the ensuing civil war, he remained loyal to Mu'awiya. During the armistice and negotiations that followed the first clashes between the forces of Mu'awiya and the fourth Caliph, Ali ibn Abi Talib, Habib, along with Shurahbil ibn al-Simt al-Kindi and Ma'n ibn Yazid al-Sulami, was sent as an envoy to Ali. Habib demanded of Ali the surrender of Uthman's murderers, as well as asking him to resign the caliphal office and submitting the issue of succession to a council (shura), terms which Ali rejected with scorn.

During the three-day Battle of Siffin on July 26–28, Habib commanded the left wing of the Syrian army, facing Abd Allah ibn Budayl at the head of Yemenite forces stiffened by a force of "Quran readers". He played a major role during the first day, when Ibn Budayl advanced towards Mu'awiya's position in the centre. Habib counterattacked and routed the entire right wing of Ali's army, surrounded Ibn Budayl and the Quran readers, and began pushing towards Ali's centre in turn. One of Ali's generals, al-Ashtar, managed to rally the retreating right wing and rescue Ibn Budayl, but a renewed assault by the latter on Mu'awiya's position failed and he was killed. According to Ibn Khallikan, Habib's "signal service at the Battle of Siffin" made him one of Mu'awiya's favourite generals. After Mu'awiya became caliph, he appointed Habib governor of Armenia and Adharbayjan.

=== Death and legacy ===
Most sources place his death in c. 662, before he was fifty years old, either in Damascus or in Armenia. One account, however, records him as being alive in 671.

His reputation among later generations was impressive: tall and a successful commander, he was admired for his moral rectitude and reputed to perform miracles through prayer. According to one story, after his death Caliph Mu'awiya prostrated himself in thanks to God for having such a servant; Habib had demanded that he [Mu'awiya] follow the norms of the rightly-guided caliphs, and Mu'awiya had complied. This reputation led to subsequent claims that he was to be placed among the Sahabah, the companions of Muhammad. These claims were promoted by his numerous descendants, but also by Umayyad partisans, who in their quarrels over legitimacy with the Alids tried to claim the allegiance of as many Sahabah as possible for Mu'awiya.

While Habib himself claimed to have met Muhammad in Medina and campaigned with him, most sources insist that he was twelve years old when Muhammad died, thus having played no role in the latter's regime. Isolated sources give very different accounts, claiming that he was merely two years old or as old as 22 when Muhammad died; some sources accept him as a source of hadiths, while others dismiss him.

=== Family ===
Habib had three wives, all from the tribe of Banu Kalb, among them Na'ila bint Umara al-Kalbiyya, who had formerly been married to Mu'awiya. Two of his sons survived him. One of them, Maslama, commanded the contingent from the military district of Damascus during the siege of Constantinople in 717–718. Habib owned a house in Damascus, overlooking the Barada River, as well as a residence in the city's environs, in the Hawran. The 9th-century scholar Abu Zur'a al-Dimashqi reported that Habib's descendants were numerous in the Hawran area.

== Sources ==
- Fück, J. W. (1971). "Ḥabīb b. Maslama". In Lewis, B.; Ménage, V. L.; Pellat, Ch. & Schacht, J. (eds.). The Encyclopaedia of Islam, Second Edition. Volume III: H–Iram. Leiden: E. J. Brill. p. 12. OCLC 495469525.
- Humphreys, R. Stephen (2006). Muʿawiya ibn Abi Sufyan: from Arabia to Empire. Oneworld Publications. ISBN 9781851684021.
- Lecker, Michael (2016). "Ḥabīb b. Maslama al-Fihrī". In Fleet, Kate; Krämer, Gudrun; Matringe, Denis; Nawas, John; Rowson, Everett (eds.). Encyclopaedia of Islam (3rd ed.). Brill Online. doi:10.1163/1573-3912_ei3_COM_30144. ISSN 1873-9830.
- Lilie, Ralph-Johannes; Ludwig, Claudia; Pratsch, Thomas; Zielke, Beate (2013). Prosopographie der mittelbyzantinischen Zeit Online. Berlin-Brandenburgische Akademie der Wissenschaften. Nach Vorarbeiten F. Winkelmanns erstellt (in German). Berlin and Boston: De Gruyter.
- Madelung, Wilferd (1997). The Succession to Muhammad: A Study of the Early Caliphate. Cambridge University Press. ISBN 978-0-521-64696-3.
- McGuckin de Slane, William, ed. (1843). Ibn Khallikan's Biographical Dictionary, translated from the Arabic by Bn. William McGuckin de Slane, Vol. II. Paris: Oriental translation fund of Great Britain and Ireland.
