= Uthmaniyya =

7th–10th century Islamic political view

The Uthmaniyya (Arabic: عُثْمَانيَّة, romanized: ʿUthmāniyya) were adherents of several political and doctrinal views pertaining to the third caliph, Uthman (r. 644–656), which held that Uthman was a legitimate caliph and his murder was unjust, whereas his successor, Ali (r. 656–661), was an illegitimate caliph who seized power without consultation. Although not all of them were supporters of the Umayyad Caliphate, they undermined Ali's caliphate through several revolts. In the 8th century, pro-Uthman opinion gained momentum among religious scholars, who considered only Abu Bakr (r. 632–634), Umar (r. 634–644), and Uthman as legitimate caliphs, but discouraged rebellion against authorities, preferring peace and unity over morally correct caliphs. They were absorbed by the Sunnis in the 9th century, who recognised both Uthman and Ali as rashidun ('rightly-guided') caliphs. Although pro-Umayyad Uthmaniyya persisted for some time, they virtually disappeared after the 10th century.

== Shi'at Uthman ==
The adjective Uthmani was applied to different groups at different times, although a feature common to all Uthmaniyya was their insistence that Uthman (r. 644–656) had been a legitimate ruler until his last hour and had been killed unjustly by rebels. The political Uthmaniyya, or shi'at Uthman (party of Uthman) as they were called, asserted that Uthman's successor Ali (r. 656–661) was an illegitimate caliph; as his failure to punish those involved in the murder of Uthman signalled his complicity in the regicide, and that he had not been elected by a shura (consultation), hence a new caliph had to be elected.

When Ali was elected as the fourth caliph, the majority of the Quraysh (group of Meccan clans to which the Islamic prophet Muhammad belonged) denounced Ali's ascension. Although the majority of the Ansar (Medinan supporters of Muhammad) supported Ali, several prominent among them, including Nu'man ibn Bashir, Hassan ibn Thabit, Ka'b ibn Malik, (Note: Some sources state that he was a neutralist.) Zayd ibn Thabit, Maslama ibn Mukhallad, Fadala ibn Ubayd, and Muhammad ibn Maslamah are named in the sources as Uthmani, and did not pledge allegiance to him. In 656, Muhammad's widow Aisha and his companions Zubayr ibn al-Awwam and Talha ibn Ubayd Allah led the Uthmaniyya in the Battle of the Camel in an unsuccessful attempt to depose Ali and punish Uthman's murderers.

The cause was later taken up by Uthman's Umayyad kinsman and long-time governor of Syria, Mu'awiya ibn Abi Sufyan, who after fighting Ali to a stalemate at the Battle of Siffin in 657 became caliph when Ali was assassinated in 661 by one of his rebellious ex-supporters (the Kharijites). Not all early Uthmaniyya were supporters of Mu'awiya however. Many held to the idea that the caliph should be from among the non-Hashimite early companions of Muhammad, whereas Mu'awiya had been a late convert. Nevertheless these accepted his rule for the sake of Muslim unity. With the death of Mu'awiya in 680 and the onset of the Second Fitna, the alliance broke further when Abd Allah ibn al-Zubayr denounced Mu'awiya's son and successor Yazid, and called for a shura. He ultimately claimed the caliphate for himself when Yazid died in 683. Henceforth, the Uthmaniyya were divided into pro-Umayyad and pro-Zubayrid parties. Other notable political Uthmaniyya included people such as Abd Allah ibn Amir, Kharija ibn Hudhafa, Habib ibn Maslama, and Mu'awiya ibn Hudayj.

According to the historian Patricia Crone, the Uthmaniyya originally represented the majority of those who were aligned with the opposition to Ali's accession, with a minority holding a neutralist stance. Even in Iraq, which was a hub of anti-Uthman sentiment, there were many who held Uthmani positions, especially in Basra, which was largely pro-Uthman. Ali's capital Kufa also had some pro-Uthman elements. Pro-Uthman sentiment also existed in Egypt. As the head of the Egyptian Uthmaniyya, Mu'awiya ibn Hudayj assisted Amr ibn al-As, Mu'awiya's top general, during the Umayyad invasion of Egypt to oust Ali's governor, Muhammad ibn Abi Bakr, whom he killed alongside Uthman's assassin, Kinana ibn Bishr al-Tujibi. The Yemeni Uthmaniyya had initially acknowledged Ali as caliph but revolted when his caliphate started to wane in his later years. The revolt was subsequently put down.

== Traditionists ==
Beyond the Second Fitna, little is heard of the pro-Umayyad Uthmaniyya in the sources even though the Umayyads themselves continued to stress their pro-Uthman position. From this time forward, Uthmaniyya are represented by the traditionists and scholars who did not recognize any legitimate caliphs beyond Uthman. This gave rise to the idea of three legitimate or rightly-guided caliphs: Abu Bakr (r. 632–634), Umar (r. 634–644), and Uthman. They held Ali's caliphate illegitimate for it had been embroiled with civil war. The Medinan traditionist Ibn Shihab al-Zuhri (Note: In some sources he is portrayed as being anti-Uthman.) is reported to have said: "ʿAlī had fought Muslims and so could not be a rightly guided caliph or imām on whom one should model oneself". Baghdad-based scholars like Ahmad ibn Hanbal declared Ali's reign as fitna (tribulation). Numerous hadiths (sayings reportedly originating with Muhammad and early Muslims) were promulgated to the effect that there were only three legitimate caliphs. Abd Allah ibn Umar was quoted as saying "We used to, in the time of the Prophet, consider no one equal to Abū Bakr, then ʿUmar, then ʿUthmān. Then we would leave the Companions of the Prophet, not preferring any to another." Other notable traditionists that held this view included Sufyan al-Thawri, Malik ibn Anas, Hisham ibn Hassan and Hammad ibn Zayd. The historian Sayf ibn Umar also subscribed to this position.

According to Crone, their doctrine seems to have been that the first three caliphs were religious guides in addition to being legitimate rulers. With the assassination of Uthman, the period of caliphs who could guide the community with right guidance had come to an end. Their place had been taken up by worldly kings. The religious knowledge had thus been transferred to the Muslim community as a whole. The caliphs, even though not ideal, were nonetheless necessary to keep the state from being fragmented and to keep law and order. It was important to preserve the unity of the community and avoid civil war instead of attempting to install correct caliphs through rebellion. Many traditionist Uthmaniyya then came to consider Abd Allah ibn Umar, Sa'd ibn Abi Waqqas, and other neutralists who had avoided taking sides in the First Fitna, as belonging to them.

== Later Uthmaniyya ==
With the rise of Sunni Islam in the 9th century, when the idea of four rashidun caliphs (among them Uthman and Ali) gained wider acceptance, the Uthmaniyya disappeared, being absorbed by the Sunnis. The theory initially met with resistance especially in Baghdad, until Ibn Hanbal and the majority of his followers were won over to it. The opposition in Syria continued for some time, but eventually this position came to be the majority position in Islam, with only the Shias and Kharijites holding contrary views. Henceforth the term Uthmani was used in a narrower sense to represent certain positions within Sunni Islam. The moderate Shias who had been won over to the four caliph theory, nevertheless considered Ali superior in merit to Uthman. Their ordering of meritorious rightly guided caliphs ran in the order: Abu Bakr, Umar, Ali, and Uthman. They labelled Uthmani those Sunnis who considered Uthman superior to Ali (i.e. Abu Bakr, Umar, Uthman, Ali). The majority of the Sunnis hold to this latter ordering and are in this sense Uthmani. Moreover, there were Zaydi Shias and the Mu'tazilites, who considered Ali superior to even Abu Bakr and Umar but nonetheless acknowledged the caliphates of Ali's predecessors as legitimate. They labelled as Uthmani anyone who considered Ali less meritorious than the two. In this sense, all Sunnis are Uthmani.

After the disappearance of the traditionist Uthmaniyya, a pro-Umayyad Uthmani sect is attested in the 10th century. They venerated all Umayyad caliphs and defended their religio-political imamate and considered them rightly guided caliphs. The sources do not mention Uthmaniyya beyond the 10th century.

== Sources ==
- Crone, Patricia (2000). "ʿUt̲h̲māniyya". In Bearman, P. J.; Bianquis, Th.; Bosworth, C. E.; van Donzel, E. & Heinrichs, W. P. (eds.). The Encyclopaedia of Islam, Second Edition. Volume X: T–U. Leiden: E. J. Brill. pp. 952–954. ISBN 978-90-04-11211-7.
- Madelung, Wilferd (1971). "Imāma". In Lewis, B.; Ménage, V. L.; Pellat, Ch. & Schacht, J. (eds.). The Encyclopaedia of Islam, Second Edition. Volume III: H–Iram. Leiden: E. J. Brill. pp. 1163–1169. OCLC 495469525.
- Madelung, Wilferd (1997). The Succession to Muhammad: A Study of the Early Caliphate. Cambridge: Cambridge University Press. ISBN 0521646960.
- Melchert, Christopher (2020). "The Rightly Guided Caliphs: The Range of Views Preserved in Ḥadīth". In al-Sarhan, Saud (ed.). Political Quietism in Islam: Sunnī and Shīʿī Practice and Thought. London and New York: I.B. Tauris. pp. 63–79. ISBN 978-1-8386-0765-4.
- Watt, W. Montgomery (1973). The Formative Period of Islamic Thought. Edinburgh: Edinburgh University Press. ISBN 978-0852242452.
- Afsaruddin, Asma (2021). Excellence and Precedence: Medieval Islamic Discourse on Legitimate Leadership. Brill Publishers. ISBN 978-90-04-49219-6.
