= R. Stephen Humphreys =

American historian

- Education: PhD
- Alma mater: University of Michigan (PhD)
- Occupations: Historian, professor
- Years active: 1969-present
- Employer: University of California, Santa Barbara
- Known for: History of Southwest Asia and North Africa
- Notable work: Between Memory and Desire: The Middle East in a Troubled Age, From Saladin to the Mongols, Mu'awiya ibn abi Sufyan: From Arabia to Empire
- Title: 'Abd al-Aziz al-Sa'ud Professor Emeritus

R. Stephen Humphreys is an American historian specializing in the history of Southwest Asia and North Africa. He was the 'Abd al-Aziz al-Sa'ud Professor at the University of California, Santa Barbara and is now an emeritus professor at that institution.

Humphreys received a PhD from the University of Michigan in 1969.

Humphreys' Between Memory and Desire: The Middle East in a Troubled Age has been widely reviewed and cited as a good introductory work on the region. He has also written a history of the Ayyubids, From Saladin to the Mongols (1977), and a biography of the first Umayyad caliph, Mu'awiya I, Mu'awiya ibn abi Sufyan: From Arabia to Empire (2006).

A festschrift was published in Humphreys' honor by the Darwin Press based on lectures given at a conference at the College of St. Benedict in Minnesota.
