= Kharijite Rebellions (657–661) =

Armed uprisings by Muhakkima Secessionists against Ali (657–661)

- Part of the First Fitna
Date	c. 657–661 CE
Location	Iraq; Afghanistan; Iran; Oman; Bahrain
Result	Victory for Ali

Belligerents
Rashidun Caliphate	Kharijites

Commanders and leaders
Ali ibn Abi Talib X Hasan ibn Ali; Qays ibn Sa'd; Hujr ibn Adi; Ma'qil ibn Qays; Jariya ibn Qudama	Abd Allah ibn Wahb †; Hurqus ibn Zuhayr †; Zayd ibn Hisn al-Ta'i †; Shurayh ibn Awfa †; Al-Khirrit ibn Rashid †; Hilal ibn Ulafa al-Taymi †

Strength
Unknown	c. 12,000

Casualties and losses
Unknown	~ 4,000 killed 500+ captured
- 3+ Muslim civilians killed by the Kharijites and 1 Christian of Banu Taghlib killed

The Kharijite Rebellions (657–661) were a series of uprisings and insurgencies launched by the Kharijites against the authority of the fourth caliph, Ali ibn Abi Talib. The movement emerged during the First Fitna when a faction of Ali's army seceded after the Battle of Siffin, rejecting the decision to seek arbitration with the Umayyad governor of Syria, Mu'awiya ibn Abi Sufyan, under the slogan "Judgment belongs to God alone."

The conflict began at Harura and reached its peak at the Battle of Nahrawan in 658. Although Ali's forces destroyed the main Kharijite army, the movement persisted as a decentralized insurgency across Iraq, Iran, and Bahrain. Regional revolts led by figures such as Al-Khirrit ibn Rashid and Abu Maryam al-Sa'di depleted Ali's resources and demoralized his tribal levies.

The period of active rebellion culminated in the assassination of Ali in 661 by the Kharijite dissident Abd al-Rahman ibn Muljam. While the Alid caliphate continued briefly under Hasan ibn Ali, the internal instability caused by the Kharijites contributed to the eventual transition to the Umayyad Caliphate. This era solidified the Kharijite movement as a distinct sect within early Islam.

== Background ==
Kharijite slogan in Arabic, "No judgment but that of God"

The Kharijite movement originated from the deadlock at the Battle of Siffin in July 657. As Ali's Iraqi forces gained the upper hand, Mu'awiya's Syrian army fixed copies of the Quran to their lances as a plea for arbitration. While Ali was initially reluctant, a significant portion of his army insisted on accepting the truce. The Iraqi consensus quickly dissolved into a fundamental theological split.

Those who would become the Kharijites or the Muhakkima viewed the subsequent arbitration as a catastrophic surrender of divine sovereignty. From their perspective, the assassination of the third caliph, Uthman ibn Affan, had been legitimate as he had become an apostate through his perceived sins, which rendered the Syrian demand for vengeance religiously void. By agreeing to negotiate with those they considered unbelievers, the dissidents argued that Ali had himself fallen into unbelief. They adopted the slogan "Judgment belongs to God alone" (La hukma illa lillah) to assert that scriptural truth was not subject to human compromise or the fallible whims of political judges.

This ideological breach led approximately 12,000 men to secede from Ali's main body upon the return to Kufa and establish a separate camp at Harura. During an initial attempt at reconciliation, Ali visited the seceders and secured a temporary pledge of allegiance. This was achieved through a general declaration of repentance and a promise that any arbitration results contradicting the Quran would be rejected. The seceders remained in Ali's coalition on the condition that the war against Mu'awiya would resume within six months.

The reconciliation failed when it became clear that Ali intended to honor the formal treaty with Mu'awiya. Harurite leaders like Shabath ibn Rib'i al-Tamimi, Abd Allah ibn Kawwa al-Yashkuri and Yazîd ibn Qays al-Arhabi broke allegiance from Ali. They left for Nahrawan and gathered their confederates from Basra with five hundred men under Mi'sar ibn Fadaki of Banu Tamim. To the radicalized core led by figures like Hurqus ibn Zuhayr al-Sa'di and Abd Allah ibn Wahb al-Rasibi, the Caliph's commitment to a human covenant over what they saw as a divine mandate was proof of spiritual failure. Modern scholars such as Hinds and Donner note that this transition from soldiers to insurgents was also fueled by the removal of Ali’s title of Amir al-mu'minin in the arbitration documents. The Kharijites interpreted this as a formal abdication of his legitimate rule.

Rejecting the authority of a leader they believed had compromised with apostasy, the final remnants of the Muhakkima departed for Al-Nahrawan. In this environment of perceived religious purification, they labeled any who disagreed with their strict interpretation as nonbelievers. This shift transformed the movement from a political protest into a decentralized insurgency and set the stage for a cycle of violence that would eventually claim the life of the Caliph.

== Conflicts ==
=== Battle of Nahrawan ===
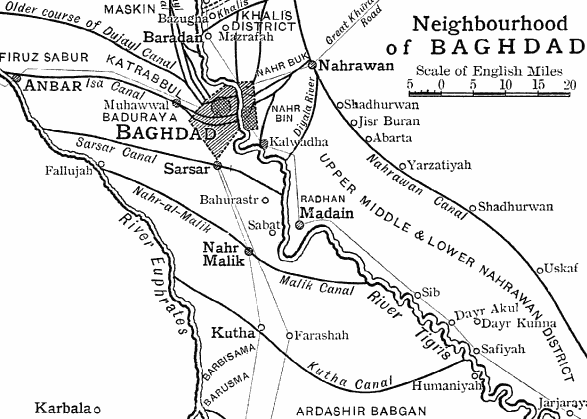
The Nahrawan Canal ran parallel to the east bank of the Tigris.

The path to Nahrawan began with an ideological confrontation in Kufa. After the Kharijites interrupted Ali's sermon at the Great Mosque of Kufa, they regrouped at the camp of Abd Allah ibn Wahb al-Rasibi. To avoid detection, the dissidents, including Hurqus ibn Zuhayr and Hamza ibn Sinan, fled Kufa at night in small groups toward Al-Mada'in. Ali dispatched the governor Sa'd ibn Mas'ud in pursuit, leading to a day-long skirmish at Karkh. Although intercepted, the rebels successfully crossed the Euphrates and reached the Nahrawan Canal to consolidate their forces.

By July 658, Ali reached the canal with 14,000 troops following reports that the Kharijites had begun executing civilians, most notably the companion Abdullah ibn Khabbab al-Aratt. The Kharijite army of approximately 2,800 men refused to surrender and was nearly annihilated by the superior numbers of Ali's forces. Among the dead was the Kharijite leader Abd Allah ibn Wahb. While the battle was a decisive military victory, it shifted the movement from open warfare toward a decentralized insurgency aimed at revenge.

=== Regional Insurgencies (658–659) ===
==== Revolt of Banu Najiyah ====
In 658–659, Al-Khirrit ibn Rashid al-Naji, a former ally of Ali at Siffin, led a significant uprising that spread from southern Iraq to the Persian Gulf. Khirrit’s revolt was a unique coalition of theological Kharijites, tribesmen refusing the Sadaqah tax, and local Christians who had reverted to their original faith during the civil war. After Khirrit defected from Kufa, Ali dispatched Ziyad ibn Khasafah to intercept him, resulting in an indecisive battle at al-Madhr. Khirrit subsequently withdrew to Ahvaz to gather Bedouin and Kurdish reinforcements, prompting Ali to send Ma'qil ibn Qays to finalize the suppression. Ma'qil defeated the rebels at Ramhormoz, forcing Khirrit to flee toward the coast of Bahrain. In the final engagement near the Persian Gulf, Ma'qil offered amnesty to those who deserted, significantly thinning the rebel ranks. During the battle, Al-Numan ibn Suhban located and killed Khirrit in a duel, effectively ending the uprising. Hundreds of captives were taken and later ransomed by Masqalah ibn Hubayrah, who subsequently defected to Mu'awiya I after failing to pay the full amount to the Alid caliphate.

==== Kharijite Uprising in Zaranj ====
After the assassination of Caliph Uthman, the rebels in Zaranj under Hasaka ibn Attab al-Habati who was a Kharijite along with Imran ibn al-Fudayl revolted, expelled Uthman's governor of the region, and established control across the Helmand Delta. Ali ibn Abi Talib, the fourth caliph, sent Awn ibn Ja'dah to subdue the region, however Awn was killed by a local Arab bandit named Bahdali al Ta'i. Subsequently, Abd al-Rahman al-Ta’i was sent to the region, who was killed by Hasaka. Ali then wrote to Abd Allah ibn Abbas to send 40,000 men to Sistan. Ibn Abbas sent Rab'i ibn al-Ka's al-Anbari with 4,000 troops to take control of Zaranj. When Rab'i reached the city, Imran and Hasaka fought fiercely with Rab'i where Hasaka was killed and Rab'i captured the city.

==== Rebellions of Ashras ibn Awf and Hilal ibn Ulafa ====
Ashras ibn Awf al-Shaybani was the first to rise after Nahrawan, launching a rebellion at al-Daskra before moving toward Anbar. Ali dispatched al-Abrash ibn Hassān with three hundred men to suppress the threat. Although some accounts suggest Ashras was merely wounded in the initial clash, he was eventually killed in Rabi' al-Awwal 658.

In late 658, Hilal ibn Ulafa and his brother Mujalid led a contingent from the Taym al-Ribab tribe. Ali sent the veteran commander Ma'qil ibn Qays to intercept them; in the ensuing engagement during Jumada al-Awwal, Hilal and roughly two hundred followers were killed. This uprising saw a brief, symbolic resurgence the following month when Al-Ashhab ibn Bashir led 130 men to the site of the defeat to perform funeral prayers for the fallen. This act of defiance was swiftly met by a government force under Jariyah ibn Qudamah and Hujr ibn Adi, who intercepted and killed the remaining rebels at Jarjaraya in Jumada al-Thani.

==== Rebellions of Sa'id ibn Qafil and Abu Maryam ====
Sa'id ibn Qafil al-Taymi launched a rebellion at al-Bandanijin in the month of Rajab. His force of two hundred men advanced to the bridge of al-Darzijan, situated only two farsakhs from Al-Mada'in. Ali ordered the city's governor, Sa'd ibn Mas'ud al-Thaqafi, to intercept the threat; the governor's forces successfully engaged and killed Sa'id and his entire contingent.

The final significant uprising of 658 was led by Abu Maryam al-Sa'di, who gathered a force in Shahrizor. According to Al-Mada'ini, this group was unique for its demographic composition, consisting of approximately four hundred followers who were primarily non-Arab Mawali. As the rebels advanced toward the outskirts of Kufa, Ali attempted to secure a pledge of allegiance through Shurayḥ ibn Hānī and seven hundred men, promising protection to those who remained peaceful.

Abu Maryam refused, citing the "martyrs" of Nahrawan, and his group defeated Shurayḥ's vanguard, forcing a retreat to nearby villages. Ali subsequently took the field himself with 2,000 men, supported by Jariyah ibn Qudāmah. Despite Ali's final demand for allegiance, the rebels engaged the Caliph's forces in Ramadan; the uprising was crushed, leaving only fifty survivors who were granted safe conduct after Abu Maryam was killed.

== Participation ==
During the civil war, a faction of five hundred Kharijites led by Farwa ibn Nawfal al-Ashja'i did not engage in the Battle of Nahrawan due to their hesitancy to fight Ali. However they considered revolt against the first Umayyad caliph, Mu'awiya I, to be lawful.

The Kharijites and the Mawāli held a common view of revolting against any ruler they termed as oppressive. The Mawālis supported the Kharijites mostly due to the burden of Kharaj imposed on them by the Arab caliphate. During the Banu Najiyah revolt and the revolt of Abu Maryam, Kharijites gained extensive support from the Mawālis in the armed insurrections.

== Aftermath ==
=== Assassination of Ali ===
On 28 January 661, a Kharijite dissident named Abd al-Rahman ibn Muljam struck Ali with a poisoned sword in the Great Mosque of Kufa. This act was intended as a triple assassination of Ali, Mu'awiya, and Amr ibn al-As to end the civil war, though only the strike against Ali succeeded. Ali died of his wounds two days later at the age of sixty-two. Following his death, his eldest son Hasan was proclaimed caliph in Kufa and subsequently oversaw the execution of Ibn Muljam.

=== Impact on Hasan's caliphate ===
The Kharijite insurgency directly contributed to the collapse of Hasan's authority. During the mobilization at Al-Mada'in, a Kharijite-led mutiny broke out within Hasan's ranks. A rebel named Al-Jarrah ibn Sinan attacked and wounded Hasan, accusing him of unbelief (kufr). This internal instability, a continuation of the Muhakkima dissent, effectively ended Alid resistance and compelled Hasan to abdicate in favor of Mu'awiya, marking the transition to the Umayyad Caliphate.

=== Ahl al-Da'wa Movement ===
During the Muslim conquest of Persia, Uthman had recruited troops from the Azd tribe from Oman. Many members of the Azd tribe after their victories in Persia had settled in Basra. During the First Fitna, the Azd tribe fled back to Oman while carrying the ideas and thoughts of the Kharijites, which would later contribute to the foundation of Ibadism.

Mirdas ibn Udayya was one of the survivors of the Battle of Nahrawan. He organised the Kharijites in the Basra region, shortly after the Battle of Nahrawan. He founded the movement of Ahl al-da'wa (people with a vocation). Notable figures like Abdallah ibn Ibad, Jabir ibn Zayd. As Jabir belonged to the Azd tribe, the movement gained swift popularity in Oman and support the family of Al-Muhallab. Jaber became the first spiritual leader (imam) of the movement. After Jabir, it was under Abu Ubayda, under whose leadership, the movement gained popularity and spread across Yemen, Oman, Khorasan and North Africa. Al-Ahnaf ibn Qays supported Abu Bilal Mirdas by granting protection to his people. Prior the Battle of Nahrawan, Ahnaf had supported Ali in the civil war by directly participating in conflicts in Ali's favour. However, some sources mention that Ahnaf inclined towards neutrality and prevent tens of thousands of defectors from rebelling against Ali, in order to prevent further atrocities.

== See also ==
- Battle of Nahrawan
- Banu Najiyah revolt

== Sources ==
- Yahya, Hashim al-Mallāḥ (2013). الوسيط في السيرة النبوية والخلافة الراشدة (in Arabic). Dar Al Kotob Al Ilmiyah دار الكتب العلمية. ISBN 978-2-7451-5673-0.
- Hoffman, Valerie Jon (2012). The Essentials of Ibadi Islam. Syracuse: Syracuse University Press. ISBN 9780815650843.
- Hawting, G. R., ed. (1998-01-01). History of Tabari, Volume 17. pp. 194–195.
- Williams, Jamaal (2024). Muhammad: the Demon Possessed False Prophet of Islam. Jesus Truth Deliverance Ministries. ISBN 978-1-304-50377-0.
- Mahdi, Muhsin (1977). "The Formative Period of Islamic Thought. W. Montgomery Watt". Speculum. 52 (1): 184–186. doi:10.2307/2856925. ISSN 0038-7134. JSTOR 2856925.
- Toy, C. H. (1902). "Die religiös-politischen Oppositionsparteien im alten Islam. Julius Wellhausen". The American Journal of Theology. 6 (3): 543–544. doi:10.1086/478125. ISSN 1550-3283.
- Hinds, Martin (1972b). "The Siffin Arbitration Agreement". Journal of Semitic Studies. 17 (1): 93–129. doi:10.1093/jss/17.1.93.
- Poonawala, I.K. (1982). "ʿALĪ B. ABĪ ṬĀLEB I. Life". Encyclopaedia Iranica (Online ed.).
- Ayoub, Mahmoud M. (2014). The Crisis of Muslim History: Religion and Politics in Early Islam. Oneworld Publications. ISBN 9781780746746.
- Kennedy, Hugh (2015). The Prophet and the Age of the Caliphates: The Islamic Near East from the Sixth to the Eleventh Century. Routledge.
- Jafri, S. M. (1979). Origins and Early Development of Shi'a Islam. London and New York: Longman. ISBN 9780582780804.
- Madelung, Wilferd (1997). The Succession to Muhammad: A Study of the Early Caliphate. Cambridge University Press. ISBN 978-0-521-64696-3.
- Nasr, S.H.; Dagli, C.K.; Dakake, M.M.; Lumbard, J.E.B.; Rustom, M., eds. (2015). The Study Quran - A New Translation and Commentary. HarperCollins. ISBN 9780062227621.
- Donaldson, Dwight M. (1933). The Shi'ite Religion - A History of Islam in Persia and Irak. Burleigh Press.
- Veccia Vaglieri, L. (1971). "(Al)-Ḥasan b. ʿAlï b. Abï Ṭālib". In Lewis, B.; Ménage, V. L.; Pellat, Ch. & Schacht, J. (eds.). The Encyclopaedia of Islam, Second Edition. Volume III: H–Iram. Leiden: E. J. Brill. pp. 240–243. OCLC 495469525.
- Hinds, Martin (1993). "Muʿāwiya I b. Abī Sufyān". In Bosworth, C. E.; van Donzel, E.; Heinrichs, W. P. & Pellat, Ch. (eds.). The Encyclopaedia of Islam, Second Edition. Volume VII: Mif–Naz. Leiden: E. J. Brill. pp. 263–268. ISBN 978-90-04-09419-2.
- Marsham, Andrew (2013). "The Architecture of Allegiance in Early Islamic Late Antiquity - The Accession of Mu'awiya in Jerusalem, ca. 661". In Beihammer, Alexander; Constantinou, Stavroula; Parani, Maria (eds.). Court Ceremonies and Rituals of Power in Byzantium and the Medieval Mediterranean. Leiden and Boston: Brill Publishers. pp. 87–114. ISBN 978-90-04-25686-6.
- Wellhausen, Julius (1927). The Arab Kingdom and Its Fall. Translated by Margaret Graham Weir. Calcutta: University of Calcutta.
- Donner, Fred M. (2010). Muhammad and the Believers: At the Origins of Islam. Harvard University Press. ISBN 9780674064140.
- IslamKotob (1936). ديوان المبتدأ والخبر في تاريخ العرب والبربر ومن عاصرهم من ذوي الشأن الأكبر - ج 2 (in Arabic). IslamKotob.
- Najib-ur-Rehmn, Sultan-ul-Ashiqeen Sultan Mohammad (2022). The Rashidun Caliphate. Sultan ul Faqr Publications. ISBN 978-969-2220-24-8.
- IslamKotob (1993). جمل من انساب الأشراف - 6 (in Arabic). IslamKotob.
- Kennedy, Hugh (2001). The Armies of the Caliphs: Military and Society in the Early Islamic State. London and New York: Routledge. ISBN 0-415-25093-5.
- البلاذري (2023). أنساب الأشراف (in Arabic). Rufoof. ISBN 9786395676051.
- جابر/البلاذري, أبي الحسن أحمد بن يحيى بن (2010). أنساب الأشراف 1-8 ج2 (in Arabic). Dar Al Kotob Al Ilmiyah دار الكتب العلمية.
- Ibn-al-Aṯīr (1874). al-Kāmil fī ăt-tārīḫ (in Arabic).
- Ḥasanī, Hāshim Maʻrūf (1978). al-Shīʻah bayna al-Ashāʻirah wa-al-Muʻtazilah (in Arabic). Dār al-Qalam.
- al-ʻAsqalānī, Aḥmad ibn ʻAlī Ibn Ḥajar (1856). Istīʻāb fī asmāʼ al-aṣḥāb (in Arabic). Maṭbaʻ Madrasat al-Usquf.
