= Assassination of Ali =

661 murder in Kufa

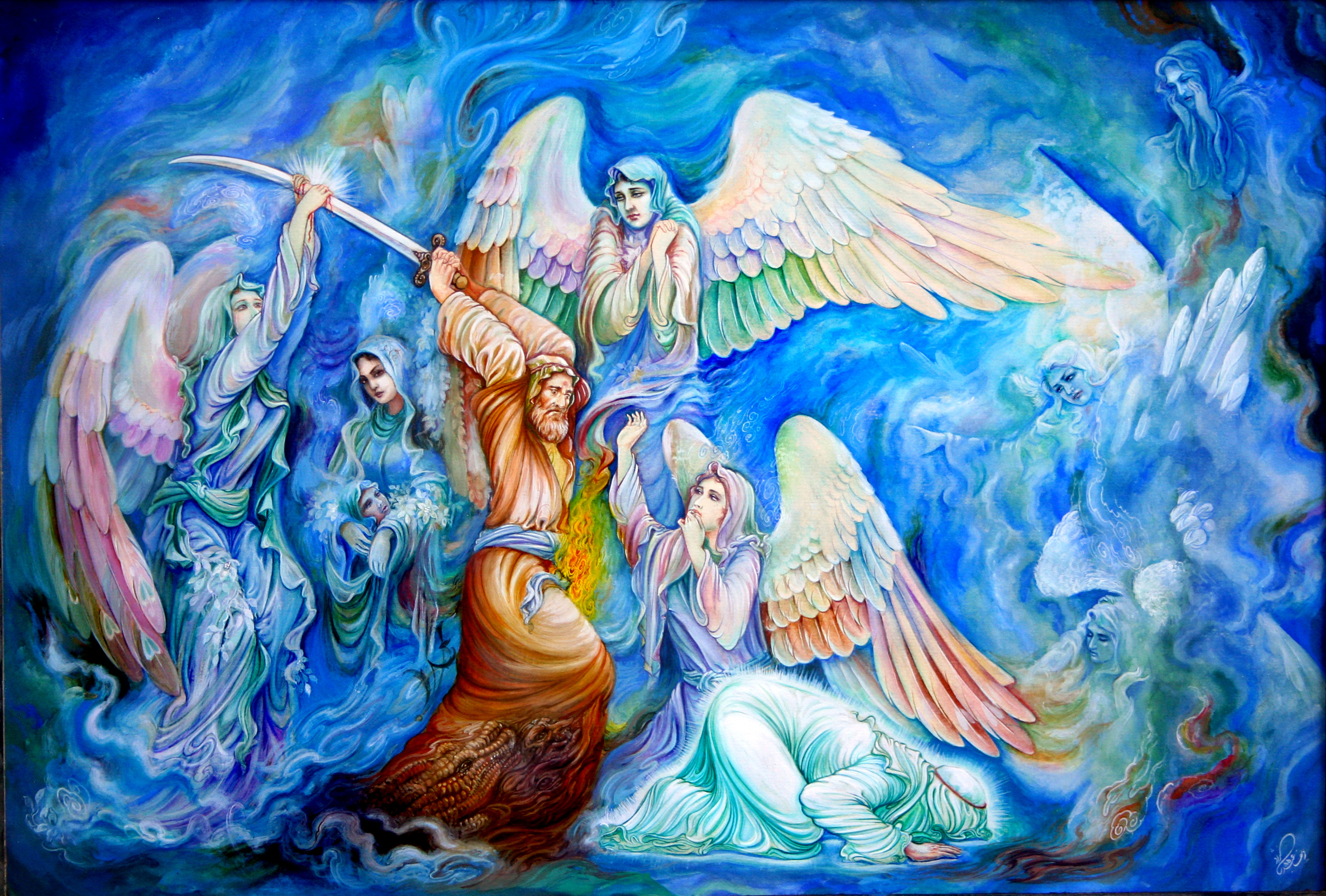
- Location: 32°01′43″N 44°24′03″E; Great Mosque of Kufa, Kufa, Iraq
- Date: 28 January 661
- Target: Ali ibn Abi Talib
- Attack type: Assassination
- Weapon: Poison-coated sword
- Deaths: 1
- Victim: Ali ibn Abi Talib
- Perpetrator: Abd al-Rahman ibn Muljam

Ali ibn Abi Talib, the fourth Rashidun caliph (r. 656–661) and the first Shia Imam, was assassinated during the morning prayer on 28 January 661 CE, equivalent to 19 Ramadan 40 AH. He died of his wounds about two days after the Kharijite dissident Ibn Muljim struck him over his head with a poison-coated sword at the Great Mosque of Kufa, located in Kufa, Iraq. He was about sixty-two years of age at the time of his death.

Ibn Muljim had entered Kufa with the intention of killing Ali, probably in revenge for the Kharijites' defeat in the Battle of Nahrawan in 658. He found two accomplices in Kufa, namely, Shabib ibn Bujra and Wardan ibn al-Mujalid. Unlike Ibn Muljim, the swords of these two missed Ali and they fled, but were later caught and killed. Before his death, Ali requested either a meticulous application of lex talionis to Ibn Muljim or his pardon, and he was later executed by Hasan, the eldest son of Ali. By most accounts, also involved in the assassination was al-Ash'ath ibn Qays, the influential Kufan tribal leader whose loyalty to Ali is often questioned in the early sources. The assassination of Ali paved the way for his rival Mu'awiya to found the Umayyad Caliphate. The shrine of Ali in Najaf, near Kufa, is a major destination for Shia pilgrims.

== Background ==
The controversial policies of the third caliph Uthman resulted in a rebellion that led to his assassination in 656 CE. Ali ibn Abi Talib, the son-in-law and cousin of the Islamic prophet Muhammad, was subsequently elected caliph by the Medinans and the dissidents present there. There he received a nearly unanimous pledge of allegiance, gathering various underprivileged groups around himself. By contrast, Ali found limited support among the powerful Quraysh tribe, some of whom aspired to the title of caliph. Among the Quraysh, the caliphate of Ali was soon challenged by Aisha, a widow of Muhammad, and two of his companions, namely, Talha and Zubayr. Uthman's cousin Mu'awiya also denounced the accession of Ali when he was dismissed from his post as the governor of Syria. He now demanded retribution against Uthman's killers.

In the aftermath of Uthman’s assassination, Medina proved ill-suited to serve as a political and military base. Remote from the main centers of Arab population in Iraq and Syria and dependent on Egyptian grain supplies, the city could not sustain large-scale mobilization during the emerging conflict. Ali therefore moved the seat of his caliphate from Medina to Kufa, a major garrison city in Iraq, where larger concentrations of troops and provincial support could be mobilized.

Ali defeated the rebellion of Aisha, Talha, and Zubayr in the Battle of the Camel in 656, but the Battle of Siffin against Mu'awiya in 657 resulted in a stalemate when the latter called for arbitration by the Quran to avoid defeat. The strong peace sentiments in Ali's army compelled him to accept the offer, and an ill-fated arbitration committee was set up with representatives from Ali and Mu'awiya with a mandate to settle the dispute in the spirit of the Quran. However, as Ali marched back to his capital Kufa, a group of his soldiers criticized the arbitration and accused Ali of blasphemy for leaving the matter to the discretion of two men. Most of them had earlier forced Ali to accept the arbitration but now exclaimed that the right to judgment belonged to God alone. Many of them were won back by Ali, while the rest assembled near the Nahrawan Canal on the east bank of the Tigris river. Following this exodus, they became known as Khawarij (lit. 'those who leave'). The Kharijites denounced Ali as caliph, declared him, his followers, and the Syrians as infidels. They declared the blood of such infidels to be licit, and committed many murders, apparently not even sparing women. Ali crushed them in the Battle of Nahrawan in 658, but their remnants and offshoots continued to terrorize for many years.

=== Ali's premonition ===
Multiple early sources write that Ali knew about his fate long before the assassination either by his own premonition or through Muhammad, who had told Ali that his beard would be stained with the blood of his head. In particular, the Sunni historian Ibn Sa'd (d. 845) quotes the prophetic tradition, "the evilest man among the ancients was he who had killed the camel of the prophet Salih and among his contemporaries, he who would kill Ali." The night before the assassination, Ali foretold that his destiny was soon to be fulfilled. As he left the house in the morning, geese followed him, cackling, and Ali remarked that they were weeping for him.

== Assassination ==
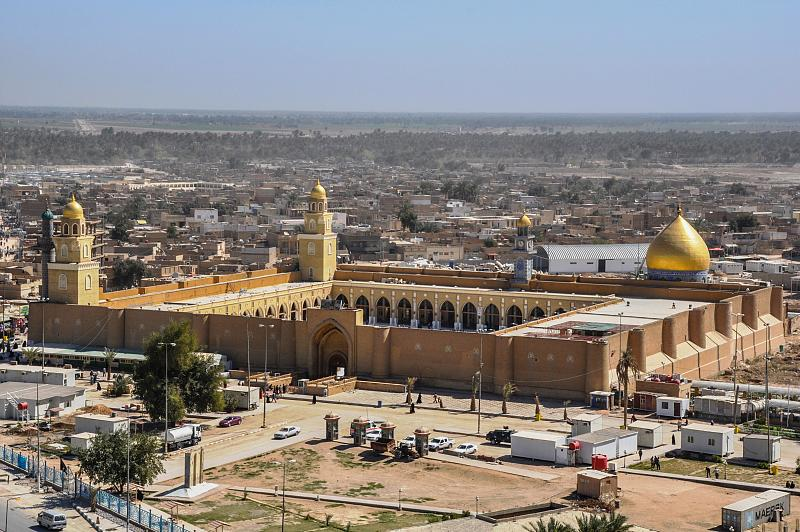
The Great Mosque of Kufa, where Ali was assassinated in 661 during the morning prayers

Ali was assassinated by Ibn Muljim, a Kharijite dissident. Ibn Muljim belonged to the Himyar tribe paternally and to the Murad tribe maternally. He also had ties with the Kinda tribe. The common narrative involves Mu'awiya and his governor of Egypt, Amr ibn al-As, as reported by the Sunni historian al-Tabari (d. 923), among others. According to this narrative, Ibn Muljim and two other Kharijites met in Mecca after the Hajj pilgrimage. Following long discussions, they concluded that Ali, Mu'awiya, and Amr were to blame for the ongoing civil war. They swore to kill all three and avenge their fallen companions at Nahrawan. Then they set the date of assassination and each chose his victim. The two other Kharijites are named variously in the sources. The one who wanted to kill Mu'awiya is referred to as al-Burak ibn Abd-Allah or al-Nazzal ibn Amir. The one who promised to kill Amr is referred to as Amr ibn Bakr al-Tamimi or Umar ibn Bukayr or Zadawayh. The historian Ali Bahramian finds this narrative logically flawed and questions the veracity of the plots to kill Mu'awiya and Amr, and the Islamicist Julius Wellhausen (d. 1918) similarly views the narrative as fabricated. For Laura Veccia Vaglieri (d. 1989), another expert, this narrative is also questionable, but probably generated from a common historical tradition because the variations in the sources are minor in her view.

Ibn Muljim entered Kufa with plans to assassinate Ali. There he found two local Kharijite accomplices, namely, Shabib ibn Bujra and Wardan ibn Mujalid. One or both of them appear in the early sources in connection to the assassination and their fates are sometimes swapped. According to al-Tabari, Ibn Muljim met in Kufa a group of the Taym al-Ribab tribe who were mourning their tribesmen killed at Nahrawan. Among them was a woman named Qatami, who impressed Ibn Muljim with her beauty. She agreed to his proposal of marriage with a wedding gift that included the murder of Ali. She then arranged for her tribesman, Wardan, to assist Ibn Muljim in his mission. For his part, Wardan enlisted the help of Shabib. The night before the assassination, the conspirators stationed themselves opposite the door from which Ali would enter the mosque.

On 26 or 28 or 30 January 661 (17 or 19 or 21 Ramadan 40 AH), when Ali arrived at the mosque to lead the morning prayer, Ibn Muljim attacked and wounded Ali on the crown of his head with a poisoned sword either during the prayer, or as he was entering the mosque. Shabib's sword missed Ali and he fled and was lost among the crowd. Being a Kharijite, he was later killed for terrorizing the civilians. Wardan fled to his home where he was killed by a kinsman after confessing his involvement in the assassination. Ibn Muljim was caught at the scene by the Hashimite al-Mughira ibn Nawfal ibn al-Harith, or by Qutham ibn al-Abbas. Ali died about two days later of his wounds at the age of sixty-two or sixty-three. His death is annually commemorated by Shia Muslims on 21 Ramadan.

=== Punishment of Ibn Muljim ===
Before his death, Ali had requested that Ibn Muljim should be executed in retaliation (qisas) if he did not survive, and his wish was fulfilled by his eldest son Hasan. Other accounts claim Ali instead left this decision to Hasan with the recommendation of pardon, asked his men not to tightly bind Ibn Muljim, and forbade his tribesmen from shedding a fellow Muslim’s blood beyond meticulous application of lex talionis, adding Ibn Muljim was to receive good food, a soft bed, and protection from public humiliation. Ibn Muljim is often counted among their ranks, and is highly praised in Kharijite literature for assassinating Ali.

=== Role of Ibn Qays ===
Often connected to the assassination is al-Ash'ath ibn Qays, the influential chief of the Kinda tribe in Kufa. As a strong advocate for peace with the Syrians, his loyalty to Ali is doubted in most accounts. Mu'awiya indeed wrote to the Kufan elite after Nahrawan, offering them status and wealth in return for sabotage, whereas Ali refused to grant them any financial favors as a matter of principle. Various sources accuse Ibn Qays of threatening Ali with death, being aware of the assassination plot, or hosting and counselling Ibn Muljim in Kufa before the assassination. An exception is one of the accounts given by the Sunni historian al-Mubarrad (d. 898), in which Ibn Qays warns the caliph about the assassination. Hujr ibn Adi, an ardent supporter of Ali, is said to have accused Ibn Qays of complicity in the assassination, while the Abbasid caliph al-Mansur (r. 754–775) blamed the assassination of Ali on (some of) his companions, over a century later.

== Burial and shrine ==
Ali's body was washed by his sons, Hasan, Husayn, and Muhammad ibn al-Hanafiyyah, and one of his nephews, Abdullah ibn Ja'far. Fearing that his body might be exhumed and profaned by his enemies, Ali was then buried secretly, which may also explain the discrepancies in the sources about his burial site. His grave was identified during the caliphate of the Abbasid Harun al-Rashid (r. 786–809) and the town of Najaf grew around it near Kufa, becoming a major site of pilgrimage for Muslims, especially Shias. The present shrine was built by the Safavid Shah Safi (r. 1629–1642), near which lies an immense cemetery for Shias who wish to be buried next to their imam. Najaf is also home to top religious colleges and prominent Shia scholars (ulama', sing. a'lim). Most likely incorrect, there are nonetheless claims that Ali was instead buried at the Mausoleum of Ali in Mazar-i-Sharif, located in modern-day Afghanistan. Among many others, the assassination of Ali has been the subject of paintings by the Iranian artists Yousef Abdinejad, Farhad Sadeghi, and Mansoureh Hosseini, as well as a stage play by Bahram Beyzai.

== Aftermath ==
During his rule, Ali found a loyal following who regarded him as the best of Muslims after Muhammad and the only one entitled to the caliphate. Nevertheless, this following remained a minority. Instead, what united Kufans after Ali was their opposition to Syrian domination, or the highhanded rule of his archenemy Mu'awiya. After the assassination of Ali in January 661, his eldest son Hasan was thus elected caliph in Kufa. Mu'awiya marched on Kufa soon after with a large army, while Hasan's army suffered desertions in large numbers, facilitated by the defection of military commanders and tribal chiefs bought by Mu'awiya. After a failed attempt on his life, a wounded Hasan ceded the rule in August 661 to Mu'awiya, who founded the Umayyad Caliphate.

== See also ==
- Kharijite Rebellions against Ali
- Imam Ali Shrine
- Second Syria campaign of Ali
