= Zayd ibn Hisn al-Ta'i =

7th-century Kharijite military leader

Zayd ibn Ḥiṣn al-Ṭāʾī زيد بن حصن الطائي
- Died: 658 CE (38 AH); Nahrawan, Iraq
- Other name: Zayd ibn Ḥuṣayn al-Ṭāʾī al-Sinbisī
- Father: Hisn ibn Wabara al-Ta'i
- Relatives: Banu Tayy (tribe)
- Military career
- Allegiance: Kufan rebels Rashidun Caliphate; Kharijites
- Conflicts: Uprisings against Uthman; First Fitna; Battle of Siffin; Battle of Nahrawan †

Zayd ibn Ḥisn al-Ṭāʾī (Arabic: زيد بن حصن الطائي), also referred to as Zayd ibn Ḥuṣayn al-Ṭāʾī al-Sinbisī (Arabic: زيد بن حصين الطائي السنبسي), (fl. 650s–658), was an Arab military commander active during the First Fitna and a leader of the Kharijites. He was a notable member of the Qurrāʾ (lit. 'Quran reciters'), religiously committed warriors who opposed the authority of the third Caliph, Uthman ibn Affan, in Kufa.

Zayd initially fought alongside the fourth Caliph, Ali ibn Abi Talib, against the Umayyad governor of Syria, Mu'awiya ibn Abi Sufyan, at the Battle of Siffin. However, he pressed Ali to accept arbitration before subsequently rejecting the settlement and joining the Muhakkima (a precursor to the Kharijites). At the Battle of Nahrawan in 658 CE, Zayd commanded the Kharijite right wing under Abd Allah ibn Wahb al-Rasibi.

Zayd was killed at Nahrawan alongside Ibn Wahb and many others. Their deaths contributed to the Shurāt tradition of martyrdom, which emphasized self-sacrifice for God's cause and was later expanded by figures such as Abu Bilal Mirdas. Adam Gaiser identifies Zayd as an early martyr of this tradition.

== Early life and dissent in Kufa ==
Zayd was a member of the Tayy tribe, belonging to the Banu Sinbis clan of the Al-Jadila branch. According to the 11th-century genealogist Ibn Hazm, his full paternal lineage is recorded as Zayd ibn Ḥiṣn ibn Wabara ibn Jarir ibn 'Amr ibn Hurmuz ibn Makhdab. He was among the Qurraʾ who expressed dissent in Kufa during the tenure of Uthman's governor, Sa'id ibn al-As (c. 649–655). According to al-Tabari, a letter attributed to this group criticized the provincial administration and expressed their loyalty to the caliph, contingent on adherence to religious principles of governance. Al-Baladhuri lists Zayd ibn Hisn al-Ta'i alongside figures such as Hujr ibn Adi and Sulayman ibn Surad as members of the group responsible for drafting the letter to the caliph.

== Battle of Siffin and arbitration ==
At the Battle of Siffin in 657 CE, Zayd was a prominent leader among the Iraqi qurrāʾ of Ali's forces. When the Syrian army of Mu'awiya raised copies of the Quran on lances to call for a ceasefire and arbitration, the appeal divided Ali's army. Although Ali and others wished to continue fighting, Zayd and a faction of the qurrāʾ pressed him to accept arbitration. Zayd personally threatened the Caliph, arguing that they had killed Uthman when he abandoned acting by the Book, and swore by God to do the same to Ali if he did not submit. Zayd also influenced the selection of the arbitrators. When Ali proposed Abd Allah ibn Abbas or Malik al-Ashtar to represent his side, Zayd and al-Ash'ath aggressively rejected them, insisting instead on the appointment of Abu Musa al-Ash'ari under the assumption that he would serve as a neutral figure.

As Ali's army returned to Kufa, opposition to arbitration grew among his supporters, including some who had initially pressed for its acceptance. Some came to argue that submitting the conflict to human arbitrators contradicted the Quranic command to fight rebellious factions until they returned to God's authority, possibly drawing on ^{[ 49:9 -The Clear Quran]}. They consequently called on Ali to abandon the agreement and resume fighting, adopting the slogan "No judgment but God's!" (lā ḥukma illā li-llāh). Historians offer varying explanations for this shift in position. Donner notes that some opponents of arbitration may also have feared being held accountable for their role in the assassination of Caliph Uthman. When Ali refused to abandon the agreement, a faction of his supporters seceded from his army and became known as the Muhakkima. They initially gathered at Harura, near Kufa, before later establishing their camp at Nahrawan.

== Battle of Nahrawan ==
Following the secession, the Muhakkima gathered at the house of Zayd ibn Hisn to determine their course of action. Although Zayd was offered overall leadership, he rejected it and instead supported the appointment of Abd Allah ibn Wahb al-Rasibi. During the gathering, Zayd delivered a sermon in which he justified armed revolt against Ali through the principles of commanding right and forbidding wrong and adherence to the Quran.

They gathered in the house of Zayd ibn Hisn al-Ta’i al-Sanbasi. He addressed them and encouraged them to join the good and forbid the evil. He recited to them some select verses from the Quran, such as... "O David! Indeed, We have made you a vicegerent on the earth, so judge between people with truth and do not follow vain desires, lest they lead you astray from the path of God."^{[ 38:26 -The Clear Quran]} He went on to recite similar verses... Then he said, "I call the people of our call and qibla to bear witness that they (Ali and the community) have followed vain desires and cast the ruling of the Book aside and acted unjustly in their words and deeds. And I call you to bear witness that it is incumbent upon the believers to wage jihad against them."

According to Ibn Kathir's account, Zayd urged the group to fight until God's commands were obeyed. During the subsequent Battle of Nahrawan in 658 CE, Zayd commanded the right wing of the Kharijite forces. He was killed in the battle alongside many other members of the movement.

== Legacy and family ==
Zayd's death at Nahrawan contributed to the Shurāt tradition of martyrdom among early Kharijites, with historian Adam Gaiser identifying him as one of its foundational figures. The self-designation Shurāt ("exchangers") derives from Quranic verse describing believers who exchange their earthly lives and property for Paradise.^{[ 9:111 -The Clear Quran]} This ethos of self-sacrifice was later expanded by figures like Abu Bilal Mirdas.

Zayd's nephew, Mu'adh ibn Juwayn ibn Hisn (also recorded as Mu'adh ibn Juwayn ibn Husayn), was among the four hundred wounded survivors left on the battlefield at Nahrawan. Pardoned by Ali, he was removed from the field to recover. During al-Mughira ibn Shu'ba's governorship in Kufa (c. 661–671), Mu'adh emerged as a primary leader of the local Kharijites alongside al-Mustawrid ibn Ullafa and Hayyan ibn Zabyan. The group regularly met at Hayyan's house to select a new amir and commemorate those killed at Nahrawan, using their memory to rally opposition against Umayyad rule.

== Bibliography ==
- Gaiser, Adam (2016). Shurat Legends, Ibadi Identities: Martydom, Asceticism, and the Making of an Early Islamic Community. Columbia, SC: The University of South Carolina Press. ISBN 978-1-61117-677-3.
- Madelung, Wilferd (1997). The Succession to Muhammad: A Study of the Early Caliphate. Cambridge University Press. ISBN 0-521-64696-0.
- Donner, Fred M. (2010). Muhammad and the Believers: At the Origins of Islam. Harvard University Press. ISBN 9780674064140.
- Ibn Kathir, Ismail ibn Umar (1998). al-Turki, Abdallah ibn Abd al-Muhsin (ed.). The Beginning and the End (Al-Bidaya wa al-Nihaya) (in Arabic). Vol. 10 (1st ed.). Dar Hajar. OCLC 4770896261.
- Ibn Hazm, Abu Muhammad Ali ibn Ahmad (1982). Hārūn, Abd al-Salām ibn Muḥammad (ed.). Jamharat Ansab al-Arab (The Comprehensive Gathering of Arab Genealogies) (in Arabic) (5th ed.). Cairo: Dar al-Ma'arif. OCLC 957348617.
- El-Hibri, Tayeb (2010). Parable and Politics in Early Islamic History: The Rashidun Caliphs. New York: Columbia University Press. ISBN 978-0-23115-082-8.
- Hawting, G. R., ed. (1996). The History of al-Ṭabarī, Volume XVII: The First Civil War: From the Battle of Siffīn to the Death of ʿAlī, A.D. 656–661/A.H. 36–40. SUNY Series in Near Eastern Studies. Albany, New York: State University of New York Press. ISBN 978-0-7914-2393-6.
- Morony, Michael G., ed. (1987). The History of al-Ṭabarī, Volume XVIII: Between Civil Wars: The Caliphate of Muʿāwiyah, 661–680 A.D./A.H. 40–60. SUNY Series in Near Eastern Studies. Albany, New York: State University of New York Press. ISBN 978-0-87395-933-9.
- Wellhausen, Julius (1927). The Arab Kingdom and Its Fall. Translated by Margaret Graham Weir. Calcutta: University of Calcutta.
- Gaiser, Adam (2022). Sectarianism in Islam: The Umma Divided. Cambridge University Press. ISBN 978-1-10703-225-5.
- Hagemann, Hannah-Lena (2021). Kharijites in Early Islamic Historical Tradition: Heroes and Villains. Edinburgh University Press. ISBN 978-1-4744-5091-1.
