= Shurayh ibn Awfa al-Absi =

Kharijite military leader

Shurayh ibn Awfa al-Absi شُرَيْح بن أوفى العَبْسِي
- Died: July 658 CE (Safar 38 AH); Jisr al-Nahrawan, Iraq
- Father: ʿAwfa ibn Yazīd al-ʿAbsī
- Relatives: Banu Abs (tribe)
- Military career
- Allegiance: Rashidun Caliphate (pre-secession); Kharijites
- Conflicts: Uprisings against Uthman; First Fitna; Battle of the Camel; Battle of Siffin; Battle of Nahrawan †

Shurayh ibn ʿAwfa al-ʿAbsī (Arabic: شُرَيْح بن أوفى العَبْسِي, romanized: Shurayḥ ibn ʿAwfa al-ʿAbsī) was an Arab military commander associated with the early Kharijites and the dissident Qurraʾ movement in Kufa during the caliphates of Uthman ibn Affan and Ali ibn Abi Talib. Early Islamic sources identify him as one of the prominent Kufan opposition figures active during the governorship of Sa'id ibn al-As, including protests connected to disputes over the Sawad lands of Iraq and broader opposition to Uthman's provincial administration.

Following the arbitration after the Battle of Siffin, Shurayh joined the Muhakkima, the secessionist faction that rejected the settlement between Ali and Mu'awiya I and later became associated with the Kharijite movement. During debates over leadership of the community, he was among several senior figures considered for command before authority was ultimately accepted by Abd Allah ibn Wahb al-Rasibi. The Muhakkima later gathered at Shurayh’s residence to discuss their withdrawal from Kufa, where he reportedly proposed occupying al-Mada'in before the group instead decided to move toward Nahrawan.

During the Battle of Nahrawan in 658 CE, Shurayh commanded the left wing of the Kharijite forces under the overall leadership of Ibn Wahb al-Rasibi.

== Background and lineage ==
Shurayh ibn Awfa belonged to the Banu Abs tribe. Ibn Hazm records his lineage as: Shurayh ibn Awfa ibn Yazid ibn Zahir ibn Juzʾ ibn Shaytan ibn Halim ibn Judhaymah, and associates his broader tribal affiliation with the Banu Murrah ibn Awf ibn Saʿd ibn Dhubyan.

== Opposition activity in Kufa and early dissent ==
Shurayh is documented in early Islamic sources among a circle of Qurraʾ (Quran reciters) in Kufa who protested the administration of the caliph Uthman ibn Affan and his governor Sa'id ibn al-As. This dissent arose from provincial grievances and disputes regarding the Sawad lands of Iraq, particularly after Sa'id declared that the agricultural lands would become the exclusive property of the Quraysh.

Shurayh participated directly in the riots at the Kufan residence of Sa'id ibn al-As alongside figures such as Sulayman ibn Surad, Hujr ibn Adi, and Malik al-Ashtar. He was also among the local notables who blocked Sa'id from re-entering Kufa following his return from Medina. In response to these disturbances, Uthman ordered the leading protestors to be transferred to Syria under the supervision of Mu'awiya I.

== Service under Ali ibn Abi Talib ==
Following their return and the outbreak of the First Fitna, these Kufan veterans joined the military forces mobilized by Ali ibn Abi Talib. Alongside figures like Malik al-Ashtar, Sulayman ibn Surad, and Hujr ibn Adi, Shurayh fought in the vanguard of Ali's army at the Battle of the Camel and the Battle of Siffin. As the conflict progressed, Shurayh joined the segment of the Kufan contingent that rejected Ali's agreement to arbitration following Siffin. He formally separated from Ali's command to enter the camp of the Muhakkima, transitioning into armed opposition against the political settlement.

== Service within the Kharijite movement ==
Within the Muhakkima, Shurayh participated in discussions over leadership and strategy during the formation of the Kharijite camp at Nahrawan. He is reported to have commanded the left wing of the Kharijite forces at the Battle of Nahrawan in 658 CE under the overall leadership of Abd Allah ibn Wahb al-Rasibi.

During the battle, Shurayh took part in intense fighting and personal combat, with certain reports attributing to him brief poetic expressions reflecting the Kharijite martial ethos. He was wounded and ultimately killed in action during the engagement.

== Bibliography ==
- Madelung, W. (1997). The Succession to Muḥammad: A Study of the Early Caliphate. Cambridge University Press. ISBN 978-0-521-64696-3.
- El-Hibri, Tayeb (2010). Parable and Politics in Early Islamic History: The Rashidun Caliphs. New York: Columbia University Press. ISBN 9780231150828.
- Jafri, S.H.M. (1979). Origins and Early Development of Shi'a Islam. Longman. ISBN 0-582-78080-2.
- Clarke, L. (2001). Shi'ite Heritage: Essays on Classical and Modern Traditions. G - Reference, Information and Interdisciplinary Subjects Series (illustrated ed.). Global Academic Publishing. ISBN 978-1-58684-066-2.
- Ibn Hazm, Abu Muhammad Ali ibn Ahmad (1982). Harun, Abd al-Salam Muhammad (ed.). Jamharat Ansab al-Arab (in Arabic) (5th ed.). Cairo: Dar al-Ma'arif.
- Hawting, G. R., ed. (1996). The History of al-Ṭabarī, Volume XVII: The First Civil War: From the Battle of Siffīn to the Death of ʿAlī, A.D. 656–661/A.H. 36–40. SUNY Series in Near Eastern Studies. Albany, New York: State University of New York Press. ISBN 978-0-7914-2393-6.
- Anthony, Sean (2011). The Caliph and the Heretic: Ibn Saba' and the Origins of Shi'ism. BRILL. ISBN 978-90-04-20930-5.
