= Muhakkima =

Muslims who reject a 657 arbitration

Muḥakkima (Arabic: محكّمة), also known as al-Haruriyya (Arabic: الحرورية), were the Muslims who rejected arbitration between Ali and Mu'awiya I at the Battle of Siffin in 657 CE. The name Muḥakkima derives from their slogan lā ḥukma illā li-llāh (لا حكم إلا لله), meaning "no judgment (hukm) except God's". The name al-Haruriyya refers to their withdrawal from Ali's army to the village of Harura' near Kufa. This episode marked the start of the Kharijite movement, and the term muḥakkima is often also applied by extension to later Kharijites.

Historically, some scholars introduced followers of the Quran alone as the Haroori. In recent times, some adherents of Ibadism, which is commonly identified as a moderate offshoot of the Kharijite movement, have said that the precursors of both Ibadism and extremist Kharijite sects should be properly called Muḥakkima and al-Haruriyya rather than Kharijites.

== History ==
According to al-Shahrastani, an 11th-century Shafi'i scholar, the proto-Kharijite group was called al-Muhakkima al-Ula. They were rooted in the caliphate horsemen that existed in the time of Muhammad. The al-Muhakkima al-Ula group were led by a figure named Dhu al-Khuwaishirah at-Tamimi, more famously known as Hurqus ibn Zuhayr al-Sa'di, a Tamimi tribal chieftain, veteran of the Battle of Hunayn and first-generation Kharijite who protested the war spoils distribution. According to several Hadiths, Hurqus was recorded being prophesied by Muhammad that he will revolt against the Caliphate later.

At first, Hurqus's forces were among those who participated in the Muslim conquest of Persia led by Arfajah, a Rashidun general who commanded the army and the navy in Iraq. During the Conquest of Khuzestan, Hurqus defeated Hormuzan in 638 at Ahvaz (known as Hormizd-Ardashir in the modern era) to subdue the city. However, later during the reign of Uthman, Hurqus was one of the ringleaders from Basra who conspired to assassinate Uthman. They were the soldiers of Ali during the Battle of Siffin, who later rebelled against the Caliphate of Ali and planned their rebellion in the village of Haruri.

The host of Hurqus also contained another Kharijite embryo that hailed from the Bajila tribe, which was led by Abd Allah ibn Wahb al-Rasibi, who later became the founder of the Ibadi group.

=== Battle of Siffin ===
During the Battle of Siffin, Mu'awiya proposed that Ali settle their dispute through arbitration, with each side appointing referees to pronounce judgment according to the Quran. While most of Ali's army accepted the proposal, one group, mostly from the tribe of Tamim, vehemently objected to the arbitration, seeing it as setting human judgment above God's word. They expressed their protest by proclaiming that "there is no judge but God and there is no judgment but God's" (lā ḥakama illā-llāh, wa-lā ḥukma illā li-llāh. or lā ḥukmu illā li-llāh) This is a reference to the verse fal-hukmu lillah in Quran 40:12. From this expression, which they were the first to use, they became known as al-muḥakkima, or al-muḥakkima al-ula (lit. 'the first Muḥakkima'). The term may have originally referred ironically to their rejection of arbitration, since the word muhakkim means "arbiter".

=== Later developments ===
The initial group of dissenters, including Hurqus ibn Zuhayr as-Sa'di, went to the village of Harura near Kufa, where they elected an obscure soldier named Abd Allah ibn Wahb al-Rasibi as their leader. This gave rise to their alternative name, al-Haruriyya. Other defectors from Kufa, where Ali's army had returned awaiting the outcome of arbitration, gradually joined the dissenters, while Ali persuaded some dissenters to return to Kufa. However, when the arbitration ended in a verdict unfavorable to Ali, a large number of his followers left Kufa to join Ibn Wahb, who had meanwhile moved his camp to another location along the Nahrawan Canal.

At this point, the Kharijites proclaimed Ali's caliphate to be null and void and began to denounce as infidels anyone who did not accept their point of view. From Nahrawan, they began to agitate against Ali and raid his territories. When attempts at conciliation failed, Ali's forces attacked the Kharijites in their camp, inflicting a heavy defeat on them at the Battle of Nahrawan in 658. This bloodshed sealed the split of the Kharijites from Ali's followers, and Kharijite calls for revenge ultimately led to Ali's assassination in 661.

On a larger scale, remnants of Hurqus' group of the Muhakkima al-Ula or the Haruriyya proto-Kharijites who had survived the battle of Nahrawan would later influence the splinter sects of Azariqa, Sufriyyah, Ibadiyyah, Yazidiyyah, Maimuniyyah, Ajaridah, al-Baihasiyyah, and the Najdat radical sects. (Note: Sunni Muslim scholars agreed that Yazidiyyah and Maimuniyyah were the most deviant among all Kharijite sects according to Islamic Iman doctrine, as they have further different concept of prophet in Islam and the Qur'an. Thus, according to Prof. Dr. Muhammad Isa al-Hariri were the reasons the jurists and scholars of Islam to brand the Yazidiyyah and Maimuniyyah as true Kafir (Heretic in Islam)) These violent warrior sects would plague the entire history of the Rashidun, Umayyad, and Abbasid Caliphates with endemic rebellions.

The egalitarian Kharijite doctrine brought about by the Sufrite branch preachers even also found homage among the flocks of Berber soldiers due to their largely unequal treatment under the Caliphate, Thus inciting the Berber revolt which weakened the Umayyad Caliphate to certain degree.

== Etymology of Muhakkima ==
The followers of ‘Alī who departed from his army in protest over the arbitration were named Muḥakkima after their cry lā ḥukma illā li-llāh. The verb ḥakkama signifies, amongst others, this principle which means to judge, to decide and the verbal noun taḥkīm, a judgment or decision. The participial noun muḥakkima is formed from this verbal noun and denotes collectively all those who proclaim this principle, lā ḥukma illā li-llāh (لا حكم إلا لله). The unity of the followers of ‘Alī was sundered in the crisis of the second fitna (64/683) when it split into three main schools, with the extremist Azāriqa and the moderate Ibadis at opposite poles and the Sufris somewhere in between.

=== Beliefs ===
The early dissenters wished to secede from Ali's army in order to uphold their principles. They held that the third caliph Uthman had deserved his death because of his faults, and that Ali was the legitimate caliph, while Mu'awiya was a rebel. They believed that the Quran clearly stated that as a rebel Mu'awiya was not entitled to arbitration, but rather should be fought until he repented, pointing to the following verses:

If two parties of the faithful fight each other, then conciliate them. Yet if one is rebellious to the other, then fight the insolent one until it returns to God 's command. (Quran 49:9)

Fight them until there is no fitnah (temptation), and religion is wholly unto God (Quran 8:39-40)

The dissenters held that in agreeing to arbitration Ali committed the grave sin of rejecting God's judgment (hukm) and attempted to substitute human judgment for God's clear injunction, which prompted their motto lā ḥukma illā li-llāh (لا حكم إلا لله, 'judgement belongs to God alone'). They also believed that Muslims own allegiance only to the Quran and the sunna of Muhammad, Abu Bakr, and Umar, and denied that the right to the imamate should be based on close kinship with Muhammad. These beliefs found expression in their departure from Ali's army.

Khaled Abou El Fadl writes,

Anecdotal reports about the debates between 'Ali and the Khawarij reflect unmistakable tension about the meaning of legality and the implications of the rule of law. In one such report members of the Khawarij accused 'Ali of accepting the judgment and dominion (hakimiyya) of human beings instead of abiding by the dominion of God's law. Upon hearing of this accusation, 'Ali called on the people to gather around him and brought out a large copy of the Qur'an. 'Ali touched the Qur'an while instructing it to speak to the people and inform them about God's law. Surprised, the people who had gathered around 'Ali exclaimed, "What are you doing? The Qur'an cannot speak, for it is not a human being!" Upon hearing this, 'Ali exclaimed that this was exactly his point. The Qur'an, 'Ali explained, is but ink and paper, and it does not speak for itself. Instead, it is human beings who give effect to it according to their limited personal judgments and opinions. [... In] the historical context, the Khawarij's sloganeering was initially a call for the symbolism of legality and the supremacy of law that later descended into an unequivocal radicalized demand for fixed lines of demarcation between what is lawful and unlawful.

=== Saba'iyya ===
Aside from the name of al-Muhakkima Muslim scholars and chroniclers also coined a name of Saba'iyya towards the group as derogatory nickname, which means "the followers of Abdullah ibn Saba'. As Muhammad Sa'id Roslan, Egyptian Madkhali cleric explained the medieval Islamic scholars associate the early Kharijites who killed Uthman as those who follow Abdullah ibn Saba'.

== Ibadis and Kharijites ==
Both Muslim and non-Muslim scholars tend to refer to Ibadis as "moderate Kharijites", and Ibadis are commonly identified in academic sources as an offshoot of the Kharijite movement, which broke away from more extremist Kharijites currents in the late 7th century CE. Most scholars identify Kharijites as those who seceded from Ali's army because of their rejection of arbitration. Ibadis have traditionally used the adjective Wahbi (referring to Ibn Wahb al-Rasibi) to describe their denomination and strongly identified with ahl al-Nahrawan (the people of Nahrawan). Until recently, some Ibadis also identified Ibadism as a sect of Kharijism. During the 20th century, Ibadis moved away from sectarianism and favored a rapprochement with Sunni Islam. Over time, Ibadis grew uncomfortable with the Kharijite label, and contemporary Ibadis strongly object to being classified as Kharijites. In their objections, some modern Ibadi authors point to the differences between Ibadi doctrine and some of the more extreme beliefs commonly associated with Kharijites. The Ibadi scholar Nasir ibn Silayman al-Sabi'i has argued that the precursors of Ibadis should be called al-Muḥakkima and al-Haruriyya, and that the first clear use of the term khawarij (Kharijites) as a proper noun appears only after the split of Ibadis from more extremist Kharijite sects.

== See also ==
- Kharijites
- Kharijite Rebellions (866–896)
- Quranism

== Bibliography ==
- Clarke, Nicola (2013). "'They are the most treacherous of people': religious difference in Arabic accounts of three early medieval Berber revolts" (PDF). EHumanista. 24: 510–525.
- Donner, Fred M. (2014-07-14). The Early Islamic Conquests. Princeton University Press. ISBN 978-1-4008-4787-7.
- Irham Zuhdi, Masturi; Abidun, M. (2015). Ensiklopedi Aliran dan Madzhab Di Dunia Islam [Encyclopedia of sects and Schools in the Islamic World; Arabic:Silsilah al-mawsu'at islamiyahmutakhasshihah; mausu'ah al-firad wa al-madzhahib fi al-alam al-islam] (in Indonesian). Pustaka al Kautsar; Tim Riset Majelis Tinggi Urusan Islam Mesir (Egyptian Islamic Affairs High Council Research Team). pp. 399–423. ISBN 978979-5926948.
- J. T. Brown, William (1963). Kharijite Political Influences in Medieval Berbery. University of Wisconsin--Madison. pp. 11–16.
- Jalalipour, Saeid (2014). The Arab Conquest of Persia: The Khūzistān Province before and after the Muslims Triumph (PDF). Sasanika.
- Kenney, Jeffrey T. (2006-10-12). Muslim Rebels: Kharijites and the Politics of Extremism in Egypt. Oxford University Press, USA. ISBN 978-0-19-513169-7.
- Subani, Hamad (2013). The Secret History of Iran. Lulu.com. ISBN 978-1-304-08289-3.
- Timani, Hussam S. (2008). Modern Intellectual Readings of the Kharijites. Peter Lang. ISBN 978-0-8204-9701-3.
