= Second Syria campaign of Ali =

Planned military offensive by Caliph Ali against Mu'awiya I

Date	Early 661 CE (Planned)
Location	Syria
Result	Plans abandoned due to the Assassination of Ali

Belligerents
Rashidun Caliphate	Umayyad Syria

Commanders and leaders
Ali ibn Abi Talib	Mu'awiya I

Strength
c. 40,000 men (Planned)	Unknown

The Second Syria campaign of Ali refers to the abortive efforts of Ali ibn Abi Talib, the Muslim caliph (r. 656–661) and the first Shia Imam, to organize a renewed military campaign against Mu'awiya, the governor of Syria. Following the indecisive Battle of Siffin against Mu'awiya in 657 CE, Ali subdued the Kharijites revolt in the Battle of Nahrawan in 658, but his military coalition in Iraq collapsed afterward when the tribal chiefs withdrew their support, as they hoped for peace with Mu'awiya on beneficial terms. Ali henceforth could barely muster enough force to repel the frequent raiding parties dispatched by Mu'awiya to harass the civilian population loyal to Ali. Egypt too fell to Mu'awiya in 658, further limiting the influence of Ali outside of Iraq. Following the raid of Busr ibn Abi Artat in 661, however, the public outrage against Mu'awiya finally seems to have galvanized the Iraqis' support for war, and a large offensive was planned for the late winter. These plans were abandoned after the assassination of Ali by the Kharijite Abd al-Rahman ibn Muljam on 26 January 661, during the morning prayers. His assassination paved the way for Mu'awiya, who later founded the Umayyad Caliphate.

== Background ==
Following the assassination of the third caliph Uthman in 656 CE, Ali ibn Abi Talib was elected caliph in Medina. His authority was immediately challenged by Mu'awiya, the governor of Syria and cousin of Uthman, who demanded retribution for the caliph's death.

The ensuing civil war led to the Battle of Siffin in 657, which ended in a stalemate when Mu'awiya called for arbitration by the Qur'an. Although Ali was initially compelled by his troops to accept the offer, a faction of his army later denounced the move as blasphemy, claiming that "the right to judgment belonged to God alone." This group, known as the Khawarij (lit. 'those who leave'), withdrew to the Nahrawan Canal.

The Kharijites declared Ali and his followers infidels and began a campaign of terror and murder. Ali was forced to divert his military focus away from Syria to crush this internal rebellion at the Battle of Nahrawan in 658. While militarily successful, the massacre of these former allies deeply fractured Ali's coalition and exhausted the morale of his remaining Iraqi troops, setting the stage for the collapse of his first Syrian offensive.

== Aftermath of the Battle of Nahrawan ==
Kharijites' slogan in Arabic, "No judgment but that of God"

Following his victory at Nahrawan, Ali intended to immediately resume the campaign against Mu'awiya, but he was blocked by al-Ash'ath ibn Qays and other tribal leaders (ashraf al-qaba'il) who claimed the troops were exhausted and needed to recuperate in Kufa. Ali yielded and established a camp at al-Nukhayla, but his efforts to rally support through his son Hasan were unsuccessful; the remaining troops deserted the camp to return to their families, compelling Ali to abandon his immediate plans for an offensive.

Modern historians offer varying explanations for this military paralysis. Fred Donner suggests the killing of the pious Kharijites at Nahrawan damaged Ali's moral authority, making Iraqi troops reluctant to fight Syrian tribesmen with whom they shared kinship. In contrast, M.A. Shaban and Husain M. Jafri argue that the tribal aristocracy intentionally sabotaged the campaign to protect their social status. Having used Ali to crush their qurra rivals at Nahrawan, these leaders reportedly sought a beneficial peace with Mu'awiya, who had secretly offered them wealth and status in exchange for their neutrality. Because Ali refused to grant financial favors to these chiefs as a matter of principle, his coalition effectively fractured, leaving him unable to muster a significant force.

== Fall of Egypt ==
In August 658 (Safar 38 AH), Egypt fell to Mu'awiya following an invasion by 6,000 men under Amr ibn al-As. Ali’s governor and foster son, Muhammad ibn Abi Bakr, attempted to resist with a smaller force of 2,000 men but was defeated and killed after his vanguard was crushed.

This loss significantly limited Ali's influence outside of Iraq. Earlier, Ali’s attempt to replace the inexperienced Muhammad with the veteran Malik al-Ashtar failed when the latter was poisoned in 657 at Mu'awiya’s instigation. Before Egypt's final collapse, Muhammad had requested reinforcements, but Ali could only muster 2,000 men after reproaching the Kufan tribal chiefs for their continued inaction. This force was ultimately disbanded as it arrived too late to prevent the Umayyad victory. The fall of the province deeply affected Ali, who subsequently wrote to Ibn Abbas to criticize the Kufans' failure to support the defense.

== Syrian raids ==
Between 658 and 660, Mu'awiya dispatched detachments to harass territories loyal to Ali along the Euphrates, the Hejaz, and Yemen. These "hit-and-run" raids were intended to undermine Ali’s legitimacy and prevent a renewed Syrian offensive.

The most significant incursion was led by Busr ibn Abi Artat in 660. Busr’s campaign reached Yemen and was characterized by unprecedented brutality, including mass executions and the enslavement of women. While Ali initially struggled to mount a response, the shock of these atrocities finally galvanized the Iraqi public. The Kufans eventually responded to Ali’s calls for jihad and routed Busr’s force, though only after significant damage had been inflicted on the southern provinces.

== Second Syria campaign ==
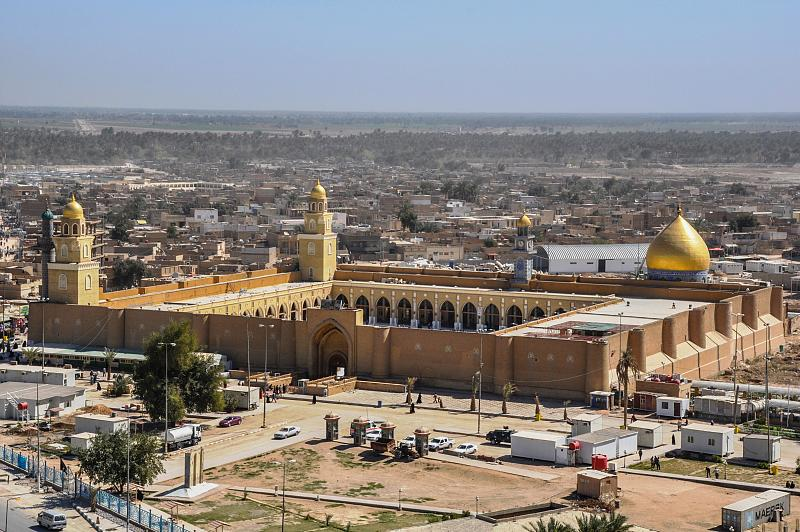
The Great Mosque of Kufa, where Ali was assassinated shortly before the planned campaign

In his final months, Ali continued his efforts to mount a second Syrian campaign. Historian S.H.M. Jafri notes that Ali's public sermons from this period, recorded in the Nahj al-Balagha, reflect his deep frustration with the perpetual disobedience of the Kufans. However, in the wake of Busr’s raid, a group of Kufan tribal chiefs finally pledged their support for war.

Ali separately recruited new fighters from the Sawad region, gathering a force that some early sources estimate at 40,000 men. In preparation for the offensive, a vanguard was dispatched under Ziyad ibn Khasafa to raid Syria. Ali issued strict orders for this unit to avoid harming non-combatants or interfering with the bedouins.

The campaign was set to commence in late winter 661. These plans were abandoned after the assassination of Ali on 26 January 661 by the Kharijite Abd al-Rahman ibn Muljam during morning prayers at the Great Mosque of Kufa. His death ended the last organized effort to reclaim Syria under the Rashidun Caliphate.
