= Battle of Nahrawan =

Battle between Ali ibn Abi Talib and the Kharijites (658)

- Part of the First Fitna
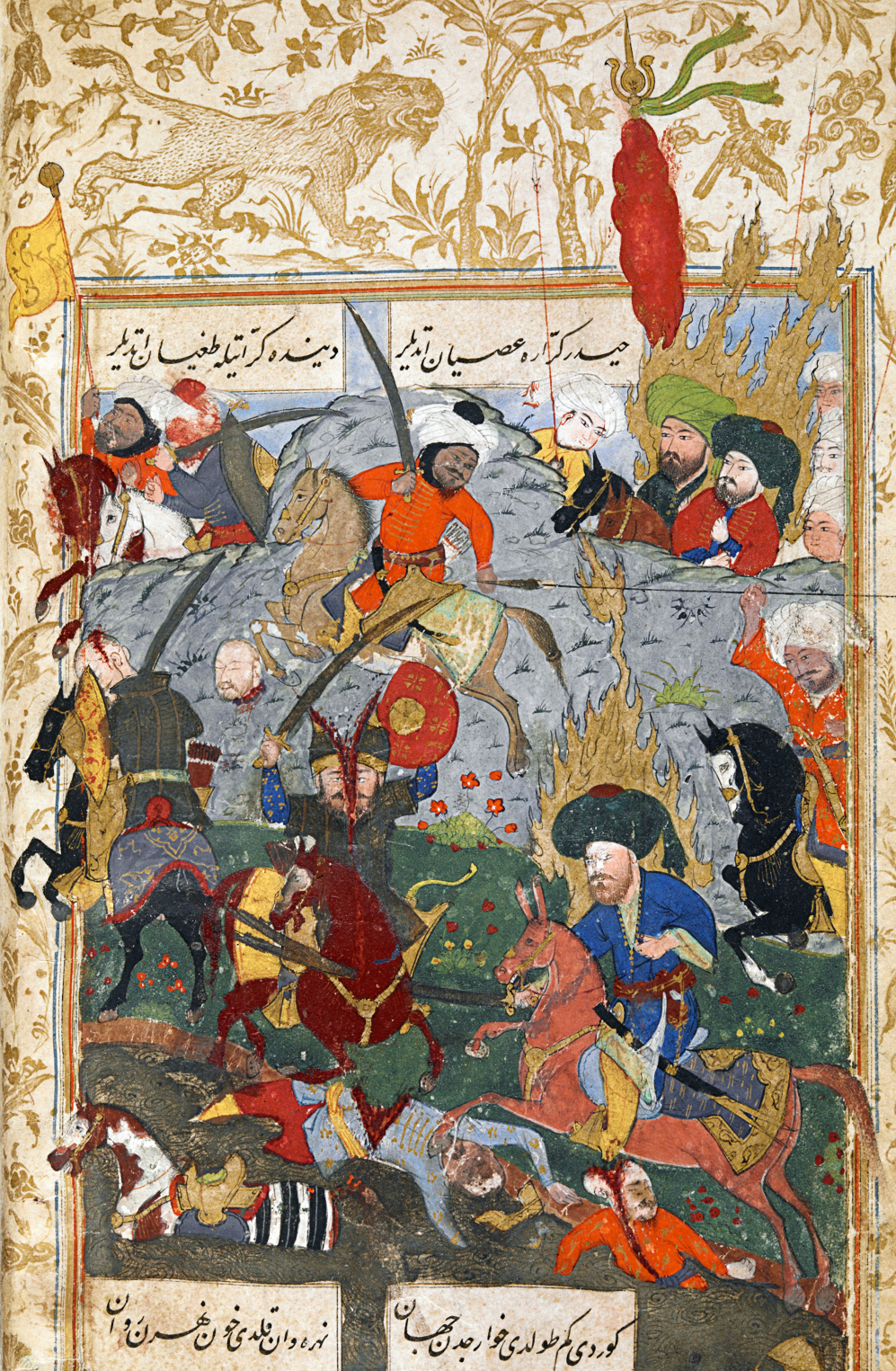
- The Battle of Nahrawan; an Ottoman miniature painting from 16th/17th century
Date	17 July 658 CE
Location	Nahrawan, Iraq 33°20′N 44°23′E
Result	Victory for Ali

Belligerents
Rashidun Caliphate	Kharijites

Commanders and leaders
Ali ibn Abi Talib; Qays ibn Sa'd; Abu Ayyub al-Ansari; Hujr ibn Adi	Abd Allah ibn Wahb †; Hurqus ibn Zuhayr †; Zayd ibn Hisn al-Ta'i †; Shurayh ibn Awfa †

Strength
14,000	2,800

Casualties and losses
7 killed	2,400 killed
- Location within modern Iraq

The Battle of Nahrawan (Arabic: مَعْرَكَة النَّهْرَوَان, romanized: Ma'rakat an-Nahrawān) was fought between the Kufan forces of the fourth Rashidun caliph, Ali ibn Abi Talib, and the Kharijites, who were primarily composed of qurra originating from across Iraq, in July 658 CE (Safar 38 AH). The latter were a group of former allies of Ali during the First Fitna. They separated from him following the Battle of Siffin when Ali agreed to settle the conflict with Mu'awiya ibn Abi Sufyan, the Umayyad governor of Syria, through arbitration, a move labeled by the group as against the Qur'an.

After failed attempts to regain their loyalty, Ali confronted the Kharijites near their headquarters by the Nahrawan Canal, near modern-day Baghdad. Of the 4,000 rebels, some 1,200 were won over with the promise of amnesty while the majority of the remaining 2,800 rebels were killed in the ensuing battle. Other sources put the casualties at 1500–1800.

The battle resulted in a permanent split between the group and the rest of the Muslims, whom the Kharijites branded as apostates. Although defeated, they continued to threaten and harass cities and towns for several years. Ali was assassinated by a Kharijite dissident in January 661.

== Background ==
The controversial policies of the third caliph, Uthman ibn Affan, resulted in a rebellion which culminated in his assassination in 656. Ali ibn Abi Talib, the son-in-law and cousin of Muhammad, was subsequently proclaimed as the new caliph in Medina. Most of the Quraysh (the grouping of Meccan clans to which Muhammad and all the early caliphs belonged), led by Muhammad's prominent companions, Talha ibn Ubayd Allah and Zubayr ibn al-Awwam, and Muhammad's widow Aisha, refused to recognize Ali's authority. They called for revenge against Uthman's killers and the election of a new caliph through shura (consultation). Ali emerged victorious against these early opponents at the Battle of the Camel near Basra in November 656, thereupon moving his capital to Kufa.

Mu'awiya ibn Abi Sufyan, the long-time governor of Syria, and a member of the Umayyad clan to which Uthman belonged, also denounced Ali's legitimacy as caliph and formally declared war. In July 657, Ali's Iraqi army fought against Mu'awiya's Syrian forces at the Battle of Siffin. The battle ended in a stalemate when the Iraqis stopped fighting in response to the Syrians' calls for arbitration. Although Ali was unwilling to halt the battle, the Kufans refused to fight and he was compelled to negotiate. An arbitration committee was set up with representatives from Ali's and Mu'awiya's sides with a mandate to settle the dispute in the spirit of the Quran.

As Ali marched back to Kufa, schisms surfaced in his army. A group of his soldiers criticized the arbitration and accused Ali of blasphemy for leaving the matter to the discretion of two men and not acting according to the Book of God. Most of them had earlier forced Ali to accept the arbitration, but afterward exclaimed that the right to judgement belonged to God alone. Twelve thousand of the dissenters defected from the army and settled at a place near Kufa called Harura, becoming known as the Harurites.

Ali, after some time, visited the Harura camp and persuaded the defectors to abandon their protest and return to Kufa. According to some accounts, they returned on the condition that the war against Mu'awiya be resumed after six months and Ali acknowledge his mistake, which he did on general and ambiguous terms. Nevertheless, Ali refused to denounce the arbitration and the proceedings continued.

In March 658, he sent his arbitration delegation headed by Abu Musa al-Ash'ari to carry out the talks. Consequently, the Kharijites decided to leave him. In order to avoid being detected, they moved out in small groups and went to a place by the Nahrawan Canal on the east bank of the Tigris. Some five hundred of their Basran comrades were informed and they also joined them in Nahrawan. Following this exodus, they were called as Kharijites, those who leave.

== Prelude ==
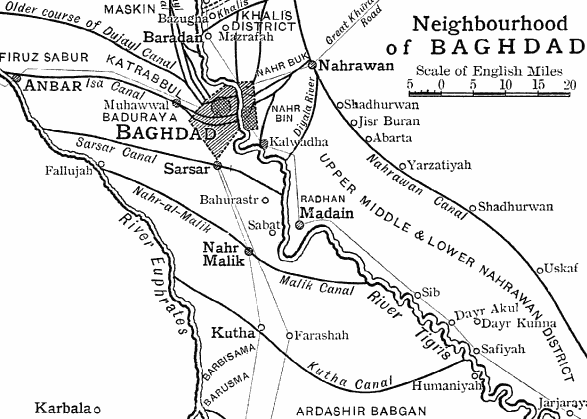
The Nahrawan Canal ran parallel to the east bank of the Tigris.

The Kharijites denounced Ali as caliph, declared him and his followers, as well as Mu'awiya and the Syrians, to be infidels, and instead elected Abd Allah ibn Wahb al-Rasibi as their caliph. They declared the blood of such infidels to be licit.

In the meantime, the two arbitrators announced that Uthman had been killed unjustly. After this verdict, which strengthened the Syrians' support for Mu'awiya, the arbitration process collapsed. At that point, Ali denounced the arbitrators as contrary to Quran and mobilized his supporters to renew the war against Mu'awiya. He summoned the Kharijites to join him. They refused, unless he acknowledged that he had gone astray and repent. Ali decided to depart for Syria without them. When Ali's forces voiced their concern about the threat of Kharijites, Ali persuaded them in a speech that the war against Mu'awiya was more important and ordered his troops to depart for Syria.

According to Madelung, around this time, the Kharijites started interrogating civilians about their views on Uthman and Ali, and executing those who did not share their views. They are alleged to have disemboweled a farmer's pregnant wife, cut out and killed her unborn infant, before beheading the farmer. Ali received the news of the Kharijites' violence en-route to Syria and sent one of his men to investigate, but he too was killed by the Kharijites. His soldiers now implored him to neutralize the threat of Kharijites, out of fear for the safety of their families and properties in Kufa. Ali then moved to Nahrawan with his army, estimated to be 14,000-strong.

== Battle ==
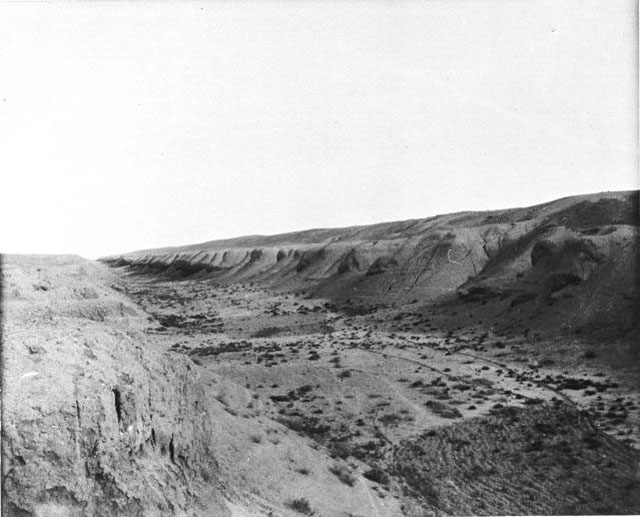
A 1909 photograph of the Nahrawan Canal

Ali asked the Kharijites to surrender the murderers and accept peace. If they did, he would leave them alone and depart to fight the Syrians. The Kharijites responded defiantly that all of them were responsible for the murders as they all considered it licit to kill his followers. After further exchanges, the Kharijite leaders instructed their followers not to engage in further discussion and instead prepare for martyrdom and to meet their Lord in paradise. Both sides arranged in battle order and Ali announced an amnesty for any Kharijite who would join him or return to Kufa and that only murderers would be punished. About 1,200 Kharijites accepted his offer, some joining Ali's army, others returning to Kufa or leaving the battlefield for refuge in the mountains; Ibn Wahb was consequently left with 2,800 fighters.

Most of the Kharijites were foot-soldiers, while Ali's army consisted of archers, cavalry, and foot-soldiers. He sent his cavalry in front of the infantry, which was divided in two rows, and stationed archers in between the first row and the cavalry. He ordered his army to let the opposing side commence hostilities. The Kharijites attacked Ali's forces with vigor and broke through his cavalry. The archers showered them with arrows, the cavalry attacked from behind and the foot-soldiers attacked with swords and spears. Heavily outnumbered and surrounded, most of the Kharijites, including their caliph Ibn Wahb, were quickly slaughtered. Some 2,400 Kharijites were killed, and 400 wounded among them were sent back to their families in Kufa after the battle. On Ali's side, between seven and thirteen men were said to have died.

== Aftermath ==
After the battle, Ali ordered his army to march with him on Syria. They refused due to exhaustion, seeking to recover their energies in Kufa, after which they would embark on the Syrian campaign. Ali agreed and moved to Nukhayla, a mustering ground outside Kufa, and permitted his soldiers to rest and occasionally visit their homes. His soldiers were unwilling to go on the campaign and in the next few days the camp was almost completely deserted. Consequently, he had to abandon his plans. The slaughter of Ali's erstwhile allies and pious Muslims undermined Ali's position as Caliph. He was eventually assassinated by the Kharijite dissident Abd al-Rahman ibn Muljam in January 661.

Although the Kharijites were crushed, their insurgency continued for several years and the Battle of Nahrawan cemented their break from the Muslim community. Many of them abandoned city life and resorted to brigandage, robbery, pillaging settled areas and other anti-state activities throughout the reign of Ali and later that of Mu'awiya I (r. 661–680), who became caliph a few months after Ali's assassination. During the Second Fitna, they controlled large parts of Arabia and Persia, but were later suppressed by the Umayyad governor of Iraq, al-Hajjaj ibn Yusuf. They were, however, not eliminated until the 10th century.

== See also ==
- Kharijite Rebellions (657–661)
- Banu Najiyah revolt

== Sources ==
- Donner, Fred M. (2010). Muhammad and the Believers, at the Origins of Islam. Cambridge, MA: Harvard University Press. ISBN 9780674050976.
- Glassé, Cyril (2001). The New Encyclopedia of Islam. AltaMira Press. ISBN 9780759101890.
- Kennedy, Hugh (2001). The Armies of the Caliphs: Military and Society in the Early Islamic State. London and New York: Routledge. ISBN 0-415-25093-5.
- Kennedy, Hugh (2004) [1986]. The Prophet and the Age of the Caliphates: The Islamic Near East from the 6th to the 11th Century (Second ed.). Harlow: Longman. ISBN 978-0-582-40525-7.
- Levi Della Vida, G. (1978). "Khāridjites". In van Donzel, E.; Lewis, B.; Pellat, Ch. & Bosworth, C. E. (eds.). The Encyclopaedia of Islam, Second Edition. Volume IV: Iran–Kha. Leiden: E. J. Brill. pp. 1074–1077. doi:10.1163/1573-3912_islam_COM_0497. ISBN 978-90-04-05745-6. OCLC 758278456.
- Lewis, Bernard (2002). Arabs in History. Oxford: Oxford University Press. ISBN 9780191647161.
- Madelung, Wilferd (1997). The Succession to Muhammad: A Study of the Early Caliphate. Cambridge: Cambridge University Press. ISBN 0521646960.
- Morony, Michael (1993). "Al-Nahrawān". In Bosworth, C. E.; van Donzel, E.; Heinrichs, W. P. & Pellat, Ch. (eds.). The Encyclopaedia of Islam, Second Edition. Volume VII: Mif–Naz. Leiden: E. J. Brill. pp. 912–913. doi:10.1163/1573-3912_islam_SIM_5760. ISBN 978-90-04-09419-2.
- Wellhausen, Julius (1901). Die religiös-politischen Oppositionsparteien im alten Islam [The Religious-Political Opposition Factions in Ancient Islam] (in German). Berlin: Weidmannsche Buchhandlung. OCLC 453206240.
