= Hurqus ibn Zuhayr al-Sa'di =

Companion of Muhammad and Kharijite

Hurqūṣ ibn Zuhayr حرقوص بن زهير
- Died: 38 AH (658 CE); Nahrawan, Iraq
- Relatives: Banu Sa'd (tribe)
- Military career
- Allegiance: Rashidun Caliphate; Basran rebels Kharijites
- Conflicts: Battle of Hunayn; Muslim conquest of Khuzestan; Uprisings against Uthman; First Fitna; Battle of Siffin; Battle of Nahrawan †

Hurqūs ibn Zuhayr al-Sa'di at-Tamimi (Arabic: حرقوص بن زهير السعدي التميمي, romanized: Hurqūṣ ibn Zuhayr al-Saʿdī al-Tamīmī), commonly known as Dhu al-Khuwaysira, was an Arab military commander and a foundational leader of the Kharijites. A veteran of the Battle of Hunayn, he is traditionally identified as the first individual to publicly challenge Muhammad's authority regarding the distribution of war spoils, an event cited by historians as the ideological origin of the Kharijite movement.

During the Early Muslim conquests, Hurquṣ was a key military leader in the conquest of Persia, notably directing the capture of Ahvaz. Under the caliphate of Uthman, he emerged as a primary leader of the provincial opposition in Iraq, eventually commanding the Basran contingent during the rebellion that led to the Caliph's assassination. Though he initially fought for Ali ibn Abi Talib at the Battle of Siffin, he later defected to become a senior commander of the Kharijite faction. He was killed in 658 while leading the Kharijite infantry against Ali’s forces at the Battle of Nahrawan.

== Biography ==
=== Early life and interaction with Muhammad ===
Hurqus, known during this period as Dhu al-Khuwaysira, famously challenged Muhammad's distribution of war spoils following the Battle of Hunayn. According to historical accounts, he approached the Prophet and demanded, "Be just, o Muhammad!" to which Muhammad replied, "Woe to you! Who will be just if I am not?"

When Umar offered to execute him for his insolence, Muhammad declined, prophesying that Hurqus would become the progenitor of a sect (the Kharijites) noted for their extreme outward piety—fasting and praying to an extent that would make others feel inadequate—yet whose faith would "not go beyond their throats." He further described a physical sign to identify them: a man among them with a malformed arm resembling a "piece of meat moving loosely," a figure later identified during the Battle of Nahrawan.

=== Military career in Khuzestan ===
Map of Khuzestan and its surroundings

Hurqus participated among the Arab settler hosts brought by Arfajah during Conquest of Khuzestan, Hurqus participation recorded particularly when he was sent by Rashidun army superiors to defeat Hormuzan in 638 at Ahvaz, and forced the city to pay jizya (poll-tax).

=== Opposition to Uthman ===
Hurqus ibn Zuhayr was a prominent leader of the movement against the policies of Caliph Uthman ibn Affan. He was active in stirring unrest against the Caliph's administration in Kufa, leading Uthman to order his exile to the Levant. Hurqus is also described in modern scholarship based on Abu Mikhnaf traditions as among the prominent partisans of Ali. Despite this attempt to neutralize his influence, Hurqus remained a central figure in the provincial opposition. He eventually emerged as the primary commander of the Basran military contingent that marched upon Medina during the rebellion, playing a decisive role in the events leading to the Caliph's assassination.

=== Opposition to Ali and the arbitration ===
Following the Battle of Siffin, Hurqus became a leading figure among the Kharijites who denounced Ali ibn Abi Talib for accepting the arbitration with Mu'awiya I. Alongside Zir'ah ibn al-Burj al-Ta'i, Hurqus personally confronted Ali, demanding he "repent" for the sin of allowing human judgment (tahkim) over the word of God. When Ali defended his decision as a matter of political opinion and a commitment to a written covenant, Hurqus openly labeled the act a sin and began spreading the slogan "Judgment belongs to God alone" (la hukma illa li-llah) among the troops.

Hurqus and his followers frequently disrupted Ali's public sermons with insults and Quranic verses, specifically citing warnings against those who "associate others with Allah." Despite this hostility, Ali initially maintained a policy of tolerance, promising Hurqus and his group continued access to mosques and their share of war spoils provided they did not initiate armed conflict. However, the situation escalated when Ali sent Abu Musa al-Ash'ari to implement the arbitration. Hurqus then joined other Kharijite leaders at the house of Abd Allah ibn Wahb al-Rasibi, where he delivered a notable speech urging the group to denounce injustice and prioritize the afterlife over worldly delights, effectively solidifying the sect's break from Ali's authority.

=== Battle of Nahrawan and death ===
After the events of arbitration, Hurqus ibn Zuhayr al-Sa'di became a prominent figure among the Kharijites, who opposed Ali ibn Abi Talib. During the preparations for the Battle of Nahrawan, leadership of the Kharijite faction was offered to several members, including Hurqus, Hamza ibn Sinan, Shurayh ibn Awfa, and Zayd ibn Hisn. All declined the overall command, emphasizing a collective approach to leadership, and the role was eventually assumed by Abd Allah ibn Wahb al-Rasibi.

In the battle, Hurqus commanded the infantry of the Kharijite forces, overseeing the bulk of the Kharijite fighters and directing troop formations and movement. Other commanders included Zayd ibn Hisn al-Ta'i leading the right wing, Shurayh ibn Awfa al-Absi on the left wing, and Hamza ibn Sinan al-Asadi in charge of the cavalry. Hurqus, who had witnessed the Battle of Siffin alongside Ali before joining the Kharijites as a staunch opponent, was killed during the engagement at Nahrawan in 38 AH (658 CE). According to the historical accounts recorded by al-Tabari, he was slain by Jaysh ibn Rabi'a Aba al-Mu'tamir al-Kinani.

== Bibliography ==
- Humphreys, R. Stephen, ed. (1990). The History of al-Ṭabarī, Volume XV: The Crisis of the Early Caliphate: The Reign of ʿUthmān, A.D. 644–656/A.H. 24–35. SUNY Series in Near Eastern Studies. Albany, New York: State University of New York Press. ISBN 978-0-7914-0154-5.
- Hawting, G. R., ed. (1996). The History of al-Ṭabarī, Volume XVII: The First Civil War: From the Battle of Siffīn to the Death of ʿAlī, A.D. 656–661/A.H. 36–40. SUNY Series in Near Eastern Studies. Albany, New York: State University of New York Press. ISBN 978-0-7914-2393-6.
- Isawi, Isa (2021-02-08). أنساق الخطاب في شعر الخوارج: دراسة في الأنساق الأسلوبية (Patterns of Discourse in Kharijite Poetry: A Study of Stylistic Patterns) (in Arabic). Amman, Jordan: Markaz al-Kitab al-Akadimi. p. 14. ISBN 978-9957-35-483-1.
- Tu'aimat, Hani Suleiman (2003). الإباضية: مذهب لا دين (Ibadism: A Doctrine, Not a Religion) (in Arabic). Irbid, Jordan: Dar al-Kindi.
- Veccia Vaglieri, L. (2012). "Ḥurḳūṣ b. Zuhayr al-Saʿdī". Encyclopaedia of Islam (Second ed.). doi:10.1163/1573-3912_islam_SIM_2962.
- Clarke, L. (2001). Shi'ite Heritage: Essays on Classical and Modern Traditions. G - Reference, Information and Interdisciplinary Subjects Series (illustrated ed.). Global Academic Publishing. ISBN 978-1-58684-066-2.
- Madelung, W. (1997). The Succession to Muḥammad: A Study of the Early Caliphate. Cambridge University Press. ISBN 978-0-521-64696-3.
- Timani, Hussam S. (2008). Modern Intellectual Readings of the Kharijites. Peter Lang. ISBN 978-0-8204-9701-3.
- Jalalipour, Saeid (2014). The Arab Conquest of Persia: The Khūzistān Province before and after the Muslims Triumph (PDF). California State University.
- Abdul-Rahman, Muhammad Saed (2009). The Meaning and Explanation of the Glorious Qur'an. Vol. 4. MSA Publication Limited. ISBN 978-1-86179-652-3.
- Sizgorich, Thomas (2009). Violence and Belief in Late Antiquity: Militant Devotion in Christianity and Islam. Philadelphia: University of Pennsylvania Press. ISBN 978-0-8122-4113-6.
- M. Ahrari, Ehsan (2017). The Islamic Challenge and the United States Global Security in an Age of Uncertainty (Ebook). McGill-Queen's University Press. p. 317. ISBN 9780773548367.
- Della Vida, Giorgio Levi (1978). "Khāridjites". In van Donzel, E.; Lewis, B.; Pellat, Ch. & Bosworth, C. E. (eds.). The Encyclopaedia of Islam, Second Edition. Volume IV: Iran–Kha. Leiden: E. J. Brill. pp. 1074–1077. ISBN 978-90-04-05745-6. OCLC 758278456.
