= Banu Najiyah revolt =

Kharijite revolt against Ali

Banu Najiyah Revolt
- Part of First Fitna
Date	658–659
Location	Iraq; Iran; Oman; Bahrain
Result	Victory for Ali

Belligerents
Rashidun Caliphate	Kharijites

Commanders and leaders
Ali ibn Abi Talib; Ziyad ibn Khasafah (WIA); Al-Hilu ibn Awf †; Ma'qil ibn Qays; Khalid ibn Ma'dan; Yazid ibn al-Mughafil	Al-Khirrit ibn Rashid al-Naji †

Strength
al-Madhr: 120–130 troops Ramhormoz: 2,000 troops Persian Gulf: 4,000 troops	al-Madhr: Roughly equal Ramhormoz: Unknown; Persian Gulf: Unknown

Casualties and losses
Unknown	Total casualties 545 killed 500 captured
- 1 Muslim civilian killed by Kharijites and 1 Christian of Banu Taghlib killed

The Banu Najiyah Revolt was a Kharijite uprising against the authority of the fourth Rashidun caliph, Ali ibn Abi Talib, led by Al-Khirrit ibn Rashid who was previously Ali's governor of Ahwaz. Khirrit gathered support from various factions that had refused to pay the Sadaqah tax and were generally opposed to Ali during the turmoil of the First Fitna. Khirrit also gained support from local Christians and fought against Ali's forces on the coasts of the Persian Gulf, where he was ultimately defeated.

== Background ==
In 658–659, Al-Khirrit ibn Rashid, who had fought alongside Ali during the Battle of the Camel and the Battle of Siffin, declared his opposition to the Caliph.

Ali asked Khirrit to debate the authoritative precedents of the Quran with him. After hearing this, Abd Allah ibn Fuqaym urged Khirrit not to leave Ali, but Khirrit insisted he would make his decision only after the discussion. Abd Allah informed Ali of the situation and suggested imprisoning Khirrit, but Ali refused to imprison Khirrit before he had committed an act of open opposition.

== Conflicts ==
=== Battle of al-Madhr ===
Ziyad ibn Khasafah approached Ali and warned that the defection, while small, could lead to larger numbers of people leaving Ali's side. Ziyad proposed pursuing the defectors to bring them back. Ali ordered Ziyad to pursue them as far as Dayr Abi Musa, where Ziyad subsequently stationed 120–130 troops.

While passing through Niffah, a Muslim horseman from Kufa was interrogated by the Kharijites about his opinion of Ali. Due to his favorable remarks, the Kharijites killed him. This provoked a strong reaction from Ali, who cursed the Kharijites and ordered Ziyad to remain at Dayr Abi Musa for tax collection duties. Ali later wrote to Ziyad, informing him that the Kharijites had moved toward Niffar and killed a Muslim. He ordered Ziyad to pursue them and urge them to return, but if they refused, he was to fight them, seeking God's help.

Following Ali's orders, Ziyad marched toward Jarjaraya. Hearing that Khirrit's army had moved to al-Madhr, Ziyad's exhausted forces marched there to confront Khirrit's fresh army. Khirrit accused Ali's forces of supporting evildoers, but Ziyad countered that he stood with God, Muhammad, and the Sunnah. Khirrit suggested a private argument to avoid a public battle, and both leaders dismounted and agreed to negotiate.

Ziyad halted his men near a water source to rest. Concerned that his scattered troops were vulnerable, Ziyad alerted them to remain ready for a sudden attack. He then advanced to negotiate with Khirrit, asking why he rebelled against Ali. Khirrit replied that he disapproved of Ali's leadership and chose to support those who called for consultation (shura). Ziyad rebuked him, arguing that none surpassed Ali in knowledge, piety, or closeness to Muhammad. When Ziyad demanded justice for the killing of the Muslim horseman, Khirrit openly defied him. The negotiations failed, and a fierce battle ensued, resulting in losses on both sides. Ziyad's standard-bearer Suwayd and the Abna warrior Wafid ibn Bakr were killed, along with five men from Khirrit's side.

As night fell, the fighting ceased, leaving both Ziyad and Khirrit wounded. Khirrit's army withdrew to Ahvaz. Ziyad's army pursued them up to Basra, where they learned that Khirrit's troops were stationed in Ahvaz. Khirrit's army had also been bolstered by the arrival of two hundred more supporters who had joined them from Kufa. Ziyad informed Ali of the confrontation, who praised his actions. Upon learning of Khirrit's position in Ahvaz, Ali dispatched Ma'qil ibn Qays with 2,000 men, including Yazid ibn al-Mughaffal al-Azdi. Khirrit's forces remained encamped near Ahwaz, gaining support from local non-Arabs bandits, and a group of Bedouins.

=== Raid of Kufa and Oman ===
Al-Khirrit raided Kufa, killing a group of inhabitants from the city and plundering the area. Khirrit then traveled to Oman and killed Al-Hilu ibn Awf Al-Azdi, Ali's governor of Oman.

=== Battle of Ramhormoz ===
Khirrit's army began moving toward the hills of Ramhormoz, aiming for a fortified castle. Local residents informed Ma'qil of their movement, and the armies met near the hill. Ma'qil organized his troops and encouraged them to fight, placing Yazid ibn al-Mughaffal on the right wing and Minjab ibn Rashid, a Basran troop leader, on the left. Khirrit's forces were composed of Bedouins on the right wing, with Kurds and local non-Arabs opposed to paying the Kharaj tax on the left wing.

The battle resulted in the victory of Ma'qil's forces, with 70 men from the Banu Najiyah and 300 non-Arabs and Kurds being killed. Al-Khirrit escaped to the coast, which was inhabited by a significant number of his tribe, and where he continued his opposition to Ali. He was eventually forced to flee to Bahrain. Ma'qil wrote to Ali about the victory, and in response Ali praised him while also ordering him to expel or eliminate Khirrit.

=== Battle of the Persian Gulf ===
Khirrit established himself near the coast, gathering support from the Banu Abd al-Qays and other Arab allies. His tribe had not paid taxes during the year of the Battle of Siffin and owed two years' worth of Sadaqah payments. Consequently, Ma'qil marched against them with an army of Kufans and Basrans.

Khirrit approached his allies to confirm their ideological alignment. Many of these allies were Christians who had previously converted to Islam but reverted to Christianity during the turmoil of the First Fitna; they were now openly expressing negative views of Islam. Khirrit intimidated them by claiming that Ali would show no tolerance for their apostasy and would execute them.

As Khirrit continued to gather support, Ali's army found the rebel forces divided into three distinct groups: one group of Christians who maintained the superiority of their faith; a second group of former Christians who remained Muslim; and a third group of Christians who had converted to Islam but later reverted to Christianity.

Ali's commander ordered the execution of the combatants and the capture of their dependents. The captives were sent to Ali, who ordered them to be sold; they were subsequently purchased by Masqalah ibn Hubayrah, who then defected to Mu'awiya I. Ma'qil raised a banner of amnesty, declaring security for anyone who sought refuge under it, excluding those who had openly fought against Ali. He prepared for battle against Khirrit, positioning Yazid al-Mughaffal on the right wing and al-Minjab ibn Rashid on the left. Khirrit's army consisted of Muslims and the Christians of his tribe who refused to pay the Sadaqah.

After initial charges by Yazid and Minjab failed to break Khirrit's lines, Ma'qil ordered a general attack. Al-Numan ibn Suhban al-Rasibi of Banu Jarm located Al-Khirrit, stabbed him, and subsequently killed him in a duel. 170 men from Khirrit's army were killed, and a large number of his troops, along with women and children, were captured by Ma'qil. Muslims who offered allegiance and Christians who accepted Islam were released. A Christian named Al-Rumahis ibn Mansar was killed after refusing to accept Islam. Ma'qil collected the two years' worth of Sadaqah payment that was due and took the Christians captive.

== Aftermath ==
Masqalah ibn Hubayrah al-Shaybani, Ali's governor of Ardashir-Khwarrah, agreed to buy the 500 war prisoners from Ma'qil for one million dirhams. Masqalah agreed to pay in installments but freed the prisoners without informing Ali. Ali wrote a letter to Masqalah criticizing his actions and demanding the remaining 500,000 dirhams. Masqalah visited Ali and paid 200,000 dirhams. Unable to pay the remaining amount, Masqalah defected to Mu'awiya I. In retaliation, Ali demolished the house of Masqalah.

Masqalah later sent a messenger, Hulwan, to Nu‘aym ibn Hubayrah, who was a devout follower of Ali, urging him to join Mu'awiya. Malik ibn Ka‘b al-Arhabi seized Hulwan and brought him to Ali, who ordered his hand to be cut off; Hulwan later died. Nu‘aym wrote a letter to Masqalah criticizing his defection. Hulwan's tribe, the men of Banu Taghlib, blamed Masqalah for Hulwan's death and demanded compensation, which Masqalah agreed to pay.

== See also ==
- Kharijite Rebellions (657–661)
- Battle of Nahrawan

== Bibliography ==
- al-Ṭabarī, Abū Jaʿfar Muḥammad ibn Jarīr (1996). The History of al-Ṭabarī Vol. 17: The First Civil War: From the Battle of Siffin to the Death of ʿAlī A.D. 656-661/A.H. 36-40. SUNY Press. ISBN 978-0-7914-2393-6.
- IslamKotob (2010). Asr al-Khilafah al-Rashidah: Muhawalah li-Naqd al-Riwayah al-Tarikhiyyah [The Era of the Rightly Guided Caliphate: An Attempt to Critique the Historical Narrative] (in Arabic). IslamKotob.
- Ḥasanī, Hāshim Maʻrūf (1978). al-Shīʻah bayna al-Ashāʻirah wa-al-Muʻtazilah (in Arabic). Dār al-Qalam.
- al-ʻAsqalānī, Aḥmad ibn ʻAlī Ibn Ḥajar (1856). Istīʻāb fī asmāʼ al-aṣḥāb (in Arabic). Maṭbaʻ Madrasat al-Usquf.
- Sezgin, Ursula (1968). Abu Mihnaf Ein Beitrag Zur Historiographic Der Umaiyadischen Zeit (in German). Brill Archive.
- Muir, Sir William (1892). The Caliphate: Its Rise, Decline and Fall, from Original Sources. Religious tract society. p. 292.
- Muir, William (2025). Annals of the Early Caliphate. From Original Sources. BoD – Books on Demand. ISBN 978-3-563-93721-1.
- الشرقاوي, عبد الرحمن (2012). علي إمام المتقين (in Arabic). دار الشروق. ISBN 978-977-09-2506-5.
- IslamKotob (n.d.). أنوار الفجر في فضائل أهل بدر - ج 1 (in Arabic). IslamKotob.
- Curtis, Edward E. IV (2012). Islam in Black America: Identity, Liberation, and Difference in African-American Islamic Thought. State University of New York Press. ISBN 978-0-7914-8859-1.
- Gibb, Sir H. A. R. (1960). The Encyclopaedia of Islam. Brill Archive.
- Hawting, G. R., ed. (1998-01-01). History of Tabari, Volume 17. pp. 194–195.
- al-Bajuri, Muhammad al-Khudari Bak (2012). The History of the Four Caliphs: ‘Itmām al-Wafā fī Sīrat al-Khulafā. Turath Publishing. ISBN 978-1-906949-76-1.
- al-Ya'qūbī (1883). Tārīkh Aḥman ibn Abī Yaʻqūb ibn Jaʻfar ibn Wahb ibn Wāḍiḥ al-kātib al-ʻAbbāsī almaʻrūf al-Taʻqūbī (in Arabic). Batavorum, E.J. Brill.
- Yahya, Hashim al-Mallāḥ (2013). الوسيط في السيرة النبوية والخلافة الراشدة (in Arabic). Dar Al Kotob Al Ilmiyah دار الكتب العلمية. ISBN 978-2-7451-5673-0.
- Sizar (n.d.). Sermons from Imam Ali, Nahj Ul Balagha. Sohale Sizar.
- Bukhari, Saiyed BadreAlam A. (2017). The Lineage of Prophet Muhammad pbuh: The Reality of Islam. Saiyed BadreAlam A. Bukhari.
- al-Raḍī, Muḥammad ibn al-Ḥusayn Sharīf; Ṭālib, ʻAlī ibn Abī (2000). Imaam Ali Bn Abi-Taalib's Sermons, Letters & Sayings as Compiled by Sayyid Shareef Ar-Razi in Nahjol-Balaagha, Peak of Eloquence. Ansariyan Publications. ISBN 978-964-438-073-0.
- Sardar, Mhamad (n.d.). KURD AND KURDISTAN. Vevin.
- Williams, Jamaal (2024). Muhammad: the Demon Possessed False Prophet of Islam. Jesus Truth Deliverance Ministries. ISBN 978-1-304-50377-0.
- صفوت, أحمد زكي (2019). جمهرة رسائل العرب في عصور العربية الزاهرة 1-4 ج1 (in Arabic). DMC.
- Rassooli, IQ al (2012). Lifting the Veil: The True Faces of Muhammad & Islam. AuthorHouse. ISBN 978-1-4685-8218-5.
- الحسين, شريف الرضي، محمد بن (1999). نهج البلاغة: Selection from Sermons, Letters and Sayings of Amir Al-mu'minin ʻAli Ibn Abi Talib. Ansariyan Publications.
- ابن الأثير (n.d.). "الكامل في التاريخ - ابن الأثير - ج٣ - الصفحة ٢٠٥". Archived from the original on 2020-07-06.
