= Baradān =

Baradān (or al-Baradān) was a town in Lower Mesopotamia under the Abbasids. The name is said to derive from Persian barda-dān ("place of prisoners"), perhaps a reference to the settlement of Jewish exiles in Babylonia.

According to the Arab geographers, it was located east of the Tigris river about 15 miles (24 km) due north of Baghdād. It lay on the road to Sāmarrā and beside the Khāliṣ canal, a branch of the Nahrawān. Between it and Baghdād there were two postal stations.

For a short time, the Caliph al-Manṣūr made his capital at Baradān before founding the city of Baghdād as a new capital in 762. Eventually, a gate, a street, a bridge and a cemetery in eastern Baghdād were named after Baradān. By about 1300, when the Maraṣīd al-iṭṭilāʿ, an abridgement of the encyclopedia of Yāḳūt, was compiled, Baradān was in ruins and completely uninhabited. It probably corresponds to the mound today known as Badrān.

== Sources ==
- Le Strange, Guy (1922). Baghdad During the Abbasid Caliphate. From Contemporary Arabic and Persian Sources (Second ed.). Oxford: Clarendon Press.
- Streck, M. & Longrigg, S. H. (1960). "Baradān". In Gibb, H. A. R.; Kramers, J. H.; Lévi-Provençal, E.; Schacht, J.; Lewis, B. & Pellat, Ch. (eds.). The Encyclopaedia of Islam, Second Edition. Volume I: A–B. Leiden: E. J. Brill. p. 1030. OCLC 495469456.
