= Abd al-Rahman ibn Muljam =

Kharijite dissident who killed the fourth caliph Ali

Ibn Muljam ابن ملجم
- The arrest of Ibn Muljam following the assassination of Ali, illustrated by Vinzenz Katzler, 1872.
- Born: Land of Murad, Yemen
- Died: 31 January 661; Kufa, Rashidun Caliphate
- Conviction: Murder
- Penalty: Death

Details
- Victims: Ali ibn Abi Talib
- Date: January 661
- Killed: 1
- Weapon: Poisoned sword
- Military career
- Allegiance: Rashidun Caliphate (until 657); Kharijites (from 657)
- Conflicts: Arab conquest of Egypt; First Fitna; Battle of Siffin; Battle of Nahrawan

Abd al-Rahman ibn Amr ibn Muljam al-Muradi (Arabic: عَبْدُ الرَّحْمَن ابْنُ عَمْرِو ابْنُ مُلْجَم الْمُرَادِيّ), known as Ibn Muljam, was a Kharijite member who assassinated Ali رضي الله عنه, the cousin and son-in-law of the prophet Muhammad صلى الله عليه وسلم, the first Shia Imam and the fourth Rashidun caliph. Prior to his notoriety, Ibn Muljam participated in the Arab conquest of Egypt and settled in Fustat. He later relocated to Kufa in Iraq, initially supporting Ali and fighting alongside him at the Battle of Siffin before defecting to the Kharijites.

On 28 January 661 CE, equivalent to 19 Ramadan 40 AH, he assassinated Ali at the Great Mosque of Kufa, striking him over his head with a poison-coated sword while Ali was praying. Ali died of his wounds about two days later. Ibn Muljam had entered Kufa with the intention of killing Ali, in revenge for the Kharijites' defeat in the Battle of Nahrawan. He found two accomplices in Kufa, namely Shabib ibn Bujra and Wardan ibn al-Mujalid. Unlike Ibn Muljam, the swords of these two missed Ali and they fled, but were later caught and killed. Following the attack, Ibn Muljam was captured and subsequently executed in Kufa by Hasan, the eldest son of Ali.

== Early life and settlement in Egypt ==
Abd al-Rahman belonged to the Himyar tribe paternally and to the Murad tribe maternally, or more precisely to the Tujib branch of Murad, while also maintaining ties with the Kinda tribe. According to historical tradition recorded by chroniclers like Ibn Yunus and cited in modern scholarship, Abd al-Rahman ibn Muljam participated in the Arab conquest of Egypt and settled in Fustat. During the caliphate of Umar, the caliph instructed the governor Amr ibn al-As to move Ibn Muljam closer to the mosque so that he could teach the Quran and religious law. Historical records also note that he was a member of the Egyptian cavalry and that his residence in Fustat was located adjacent to the house of Abd al-Rahman ibn Udays. Ibn Muljam later relocated to Kufa, where he initially supported Ali and fought at the Battle of Siffin before defecting to the Kharijites.

== Defection and the assassination plot ==
Following the Battle of Nahrawan, where a large number of Kharijites were killed by Ali's army, several survivors met in Mecca to plot the assassination of three prominent Muslim figures whom they held responsible for the community's division: Amr ibn al-As, Mu'awiya ibn Abu Sufyan, and the Caliph Ali. According to the conspiracy, Amr ibn Bakr al-Tamimi was tasked with killing Amr ibn al-As in Fustat, al-Hujjaj al-Tamimi with killing Mu'awiya in Damascus, and Ibn Muljam with killing Ali in Kufa. The coordinated attacks were planned to take place simultaneously as the targets led the morning prayer, with the assassins striking from within the prayer ranks using swords dipped in poison.

Amr ibn Bakr al-Tamimi's assassination attempt on Amr ibn al-As failed on the 22 of January, when he killed Amr's stand-in for the Friday prayers, Kharija ibn Hudhafa, mistaking the latter for his target. When the Kharijite was apprehended and brought before him, Amr ibn al-As exclaimed "You wanted me, but God wanted Kharija!" and he personally executed him.

== Assassination of Ali and Execution of Ibn Muljam ==
On 26 January 661, while Ali was praying in the Great Mosque of Kufa, Ibn Muljam struck him. He was caught at the scene by the Hashimite al-Mughira ibn Nawfal ibn al-Harith, or by Qutham ibn Abbas. Ali died from his injuries two days later on 28 January. Before his death, Ali requested that Ibn Muljam be executed in retaliation (qisas) if he did not survive, a wish fulfilled by his eldest son Hasan. Other accounts state that Ali left the decision to Hasan with a recommendation for pardon, asked his men not to tightly bind Ibn Muljam, and stipulated that he receive good treatment and protection from public humiliation. Ibn Muljam is highly praised in Kharijite literature for the assassination.

A design Alawi for the name "Ibn Muljam" accompanied by the phrase "peace be upon him."

== Alawism views ==
The Alawites view the assassination of Ali at the hands of Ibn Muljam as a test that he successfully passed; they believe that Ali is divine and that he did not die, but rather transitioned into the form of another person.Al-Khasibi states that Abd al-Rahman ibn Muljam is among those of high rank.

== See also ==
- Kharijite Rebellions against Ali
- Battle of Nahrawan

== Sources ==
- Hawting, G. R., ed. (1996). The History of al-Ṭabarī, Volume XVII: The First Civil War: From the Battle of Siffīn to the Death of ʿAlī, A.D. 656–661/A.H. 36–40. SUNY Series in Near Eastern Studies. Albany, New York: State University of New York Press. ISBN 978-0-7914-2393-6.
- Tabatabai, Muhammad Husayn (1977). Shi'ite Islam. SUNY Press. ISBN 978-0-87395-390-0.
- Wensinck, A. J. (1960). "ʿAmr b. al-ʿĀṣ al-Sahmī". In Gibb, H. A. R.; Kramers, J. H.; Lévi-Provençal, E.; Schacht, J.; Lewis, B. & Pellat, Ch. (eds.). The Encyclopaedia of Islam, Second Edition. Volume I: A–B. Leiden: E. J. Brill. p. 451. OCLC 495469456.
- Kelsay, John (1993). Islam and War: A Study in Comparative Ethics. Westminster John Knox Press. ISBN 978-0-664-25302-8.
- Madelung, Wilferd (1997). The Succession to Muhammad: A Study of the Early Caliphate. Cambridge University Press. ISBN 978-0-521-64696-3.
- Bruning, Jelle; de Jong, Janneke H. M.; Sijpesteijn, Petra M., eds. (2022). Egypt and the Eastern Mediterranean World: From Constantinople to Baghdad, 500-1000 CE. Cambridge University Press. ISBN 978-1-009-17001-7.
- Al-Dhahabi, Shams al-Din (1996). Marouf, Bashar Awad (ed.). Siyar A'lam al-Nubala': Siyar al-Khulafa' al-Rashidun [Biographies of Noble Figures]. Beirut: Mu'assasat al-Risalah. OCLC 912088985.
- Cook, David (2007). Martyrdom in Islam. Cambridge University Press. ISBN 978-0-521-61551-8.
- Veccia Vaglieri, L. (2012a). "ʿAlī b. Abī Ṭālib". In Bearman, P.; Bianquis, Th.; Bosworth, C.E.; van Donzel, E.; Heinrichs, W.P. (eds.). Encyclopaedia of Islam (Second ed.). doi:10.1163/1573-3912_islam_COM_0046. ISBN 9789004161214.
- Veccia Vaglieri, L. (2012b). "Ibn Muld̲j̲am". In Bearman, P.; Bianquis, Th.; Bosworth, C.E.; van Donzel, E.; Heinrichs, W.P. (eds.). Encyclopaedia of Islam (Second ed.). doi:10.1163/1573-3912_islam_COM_0339. ISBN 9789004161214.
- Shah-Kazemi, Reza (2022). Imam 'Ali: Concise History, Timeless Mystery. I. B. Tauris.
- Bahramian, Ali (2015). "ʿAlī b. Abī Ṭālib 3. Caliphate". In Daftary, Farhad (ed.). Encyclopaedia Islamica. Translated by Melvin-Koushki, Matthew. doi:10.1163/1875-9831_isla_COM_0252.
- Wellhausen, Julius (1927). The Arab Kingdom and Its Fall. Translated by Margaret Graham Weir. Calcutta: University of Calcutta.
