= Abd Allah ibn Wahb al-Rasibi =

Early leader of the Kharijites (d. 658)

ʿAbd Allāh ibn Wahb al-Rāsibī (Arabic: عبد الله بن وهب الراسبي; died 17 July 658 AD) was an early leader of the Khārijites. Of the Bajīla tribe, he was a tābiʿī, one who learned the teachings of Islam directly from a ṣaḥāba (companion) of Muḥammad. He prostrated himself in prayer so frequently that he developed calluses on his forehead, leading to the nickname, dhu ʾl-thafināt, "the man with the calluses".

ʿAbd Allāh fought under Ṣaʿd ibn Abī Waqqāṣ in the conquest of Iraq. In the first Muslim civil war, he took the side of the Caliph ʿAlī and fought for him at the Battle of Ṣiffīn (657). He opposed ʿAlī's decision to accept arbitration to end the civil war and joined the dissidents, soon to be known as Khārijites, gathering at Ḥarūrāʾ in Iraq. They later moved to Kūfa, where in 658 (38 AH) they elected ʿAbd Allāh as their amīr (commander) and not, as is sometimes claimed, the true caliph (successor of Muḥammad). He accepted the leadership only after two other candidates, Zayd ibn Ḥisn and Hurqūṣ ibn Zuhayr, had refused out of deference to his superior piety. They marched out in March 658 and were routed by ʿAlī in the Battle of Nahrawān on 17 July (9 Ṣafar 38 AH). ʿAbd Allāh was killed in battle.

== Bibliography ==
- Gibb, H. A. R. (1960). "ʿAbd Allāh b. Wahb al-Rāsibī". In Gibb, H. A. R.; Kramers, J. H.; Lévi-Provençal, E.; Schacht, J.; Lewis, B. & Pellat, Ch. (eds.). The Encyclopaedia of Islam, Second Edition. Volume I: A–B. Leiden: E. J. Brill. p. 54. OCLC 495469456.
- Hagemann, Hannah-Lena (2021). Kharijites in Early Islamic Historical Tradition: Heroes and Villains. Edinburgh University Press. ISBN 978-1-4744-5091-1.
- Juynboll, Gautier H.A., ed. (1989). The History of al-Ṭabarī, Volume XIII: The Conquest of Iraq, Southwestern Persia, and Egypt: The Middle Years of ʿUmar's Caliphate, A.D. 636–642/A.H. 15–21. SUNY Series in Near Eastern Studies. Albany, New York: State University of New York Press. ISBN 978-0-88706-876-8.
- Kenney, Jeffrey T. (2006). Muslim Rebels: Kharijites and the Politics of Extremism in Egypt. Oxford University Press, USA. ISBN 978-0-19-513169-7.
