= Assassination of Uthman =

656 murder of the third Rashidun caliph in Medina

- Location: 24°28′12″N 39°36′36″E; Medina, Arabia, Rashidun Caliphate, present-day Saudi Arabia
- Date: 17 June 656
- Target: Uthman
- Attack type: Assassination
- Weapon: Sword
- Victim: Uthman

Uthman ibn Affan, the third Rashidun caliph, who ruled from 644 to 656, was assassinated at the end of a siege upon his house in 656. This was initially a protest but escalated into a siege following the death of a protester. The protesters-turned-rebels had demanded a new caliph, which Uthman refused. On 17 June 656 (35 AH) protestors set the house on fire, made their way inside, and killed him.

The assassination of Uthman had a polarizing effect on the Ummah at the time. Questions were raised not only regarding his character and policies but also the relationship between Muslims and the state, religious beliefs regarding rebellion and governance, and the qualifications of rulership in Islam.

== Background ==
Following the deaths of Muhammad and the first caliph Abu Bakr (r. 632–634) in 632 and 634 respectively, Umar (r. 634–644) became the new caliph. Continuing the wars of conquest initiated by Abu Bakr, he brought about the almost complete collapse of Sasanian Persia. The Byzantine Empire was restricted to Anatolia and central North Africa. The armies of the conquest were settled in the conquered areas. In Iraq, the garrison towns of Basra and Kufa were established for the purpose. Fustat was founded in Egypt. Due to significant Arab population in Syria, Arab Muslim conquerors of the region settled in the already existing towns.

The conquests brought Muslims bounteous revenue and lands. Particularly in Iraq, the former crown-lands and the lands of the Persian aristocracy were now in Muslim hands. These became communal property administered by the state, although the soldiers protested, for they considered these lands their property. The revenue was distributed among the conquering armies. Umar also left the provincial administration to the respective governors, who ruled with considerable autonomy, and provincial surplus was spent on the settlers of the conquered territories instead of being sent to the capital. In some matters, such as military pay (ata) and administrative offices, Umar gave preference to those with precedence (sabiqa) in Islam and kept the late comers to the movement at bay, which to some extent resulted in social stratification and dissatisfaction among the holders of power and prestige in the old order.

After the assassination of Umar in 644, a consultative assembly (shura) of the prominent companions of Muhammad, which included Abd al-Rahman ibn Awf, Ali, Sa'd ibn Abi Waqqas, Talha, Uthman and al-Zubayr, elected Uthman caliph. Although Uthman had been an early companion of Muhammad from the time of Mecca and had been devoted to the cause of Islam, he belonged to the Umayyad clan of the Quraysh tribe—a grouping of Meccan clans to which Muhammad and most of his prominent Meccan companions belonged. Umayyads had been staunch opponents after Muhammad "received the divine call in a vision", and had converted to Islam only after the conquest of Mecca in 629 only a couple of years before Muhammad's death. Muhammad, and later Abu Bakr and Umar, tried to win the Umayyads over to and incorporate them in the new order by awarding them gifts and important posts.

== Opposition to Uthman's policies ==
Uthman began centralizing the power by reliance on his Umayyad relatives, to the exclusion of other Quraysh, who had enjoyed significant authority during the reign of his two predecessors, and the Ansar, Medinese helpers of Muhammad, who had already lost some importance after his death. Uthman appointed his kinsmen to all of the provincial governorships, and made a number of land and monetary grants to his relatives including Marwan ibn al-Hakam and Sa'id ibn al-As. Around the year 650, starting roughly with the latter half of his reign, general opinion turned against Uthman. He was accused of nepotism and of appointing people who were too young to important posts. Uthman's interference in the provincial affairs, that consisted of his declaration of the crown lands of Iraq as the state assets, and his demand that provincial surplus be forwarded to the caliph in Medina, brought about widespread opposition to his rule, especially from Iraq and Egypt, where majority of the conquest armies had settled. The old settlers also saw their status threatened by the land grants in conquered territories to prominent Quraysh like al-Zubayr and Talha and the Caliph allowing late arriving tribal chiefs, such as al-Ash'ath ibn Qays, to acquire lands there in exchange for their lands in Arabia.

At the head of the old settlers of Kufa, who subsequently became known as qurra (Qur'an reciters), Malik ibn al-Harith began opposing Uthman's policies. Events came to a head when Uthman's governor of Kufa, his relative Sa'id ibn al-As, was expelled from the city by the qurra. They declared the companion Abu Musa al-Ash'ari – who had earlier been deposed from the governorship of Basra by Uthman and at that time resided in Kufa – their governor.

Uthman deposed from the governorship of Egypt Amr ibn al-As, the conqueror of the province who was popular among the Egyptian troops, in 645–646 and appointed Abd Allah ibn Sa'd in his stead. As Sa'id ibn al-As was to do in Kufa, Ibn Sa'd started taking control of the financial system of the province, forwarding surplus to the capital. The settlers were dissatisfied with this arrangement. In about 654, tension spilled into opposition, and some resentful elements under the leadership of Uthman's adopted son Muhammad ibn Abi Hudhayfa and Abu Bakr's son Muhammad, who was the adopted son of Ali, refused to pray behind the governor (the custom was that the government representative would lead the prayers). In January 655, Ibn Sa'd was ejected from Egypt by the discontented group, who took over the administration of the province in their own hands.

The provincial discontent was coupled with the dissatisfaction of the Ansar and the Quraysh of Medina, including a number of senior companions of Muhammad, who under Uthman had lost their influence and prestige to Umayyads. Qurayshi clans like Zuhra, Hashim, and Makhzum had withdrawn their support of Uthman, whereas companions Amr ibn al-As, Talha and Muhammad's widow A'isha had been severely criticizing the Caliph, accusing him of nepotism and bid'a (innovation in religion). Amr is said to have incited Quraysh against Uthman and urged senior companions to confront him. Letters were sent to Kufa and Egypt by the wives of Muhammad led by A'isha (they were deeply respected as "mothers of the believers") (Note: A'isha later denied having written any letters.) which urged the provincials to rise up against Uthman. Ibn Abi Bakr and Ibn Abi Hudhayfa are reported to have deserted a Muslim campaign against the Byzantines, claiming that jihad against the internal enemy (i.e. Uthman) was more important than against the external one, after receiving such a letter. Talha is also reported to have sent such letters to Kufans and Basrans.

Concerning the events which led to siege of Uthman, Wilferd Madelung writes: 'Uthman ibn 'Affan expressed generosity toward his kin, Banu Abd-Shams, who seemed to dominate him, and his supposed arrogant mistreatment toward several of the earliest companions such as Abu Dharr al-Ghifari, Abd-Allah ibn Mas'ud and Ammar ibn Yasir provoked outrage among some groups of people. Overt resistance arose in 650–651 throughout most of the Empire. The dissatisfaction with his rule and the governments appointed by him was not restricted to the provinces outside Arabia. When Uthman's kin, especially Marwan, gained control over him, the companions, including most of the members of elector council, turned against him or at least withdrew their support, putting pressure on the caliph to mend his ways and reduce the influence of his assertive kin.

== Riot ==
Dissatisfaction finally led to rebellion in Egypt, Kufa and Basra. When Egyptian rebels gathered near Medina, Uthman asked Ali to speak with them. The delegates of emigrants led by Ali and the delegates of Ansar led by Muhammad ibn Maslama met them and persuaded them to return. The delegates promised the rebels, in the name of the caliph, redress for all their grievances and agreed to act as guarantors. Due to this mediation and Uthman's commitment, the rebels backed down. As the rebel party was then departing for Egypt, they were overtaken by a courier from Medina. They discovered that the courier was carrying a letter which allegedly bore Caliph Uthman's official seal. The letter instructed the Egyptian governor to kill the rebel party once it arrived back home. Historians now consider the letter to have been issued not by Uthman, but his secretary, Marwan ibn al-Hakam. However, upon discovering the contents of the letter, the rebel party immediately returned to Medina and began the siege.

== Beginning of the siege ==
When Egyptian rebels returned to Medina, outraged by the official letter ordering the capital punishment of their leaders, Ali as the guarantor of Uthman's promises, asked Uthman to speak with the rebels directly. Uthman denied any knowledge of the letter, and Ali and Muhammad Ibn Maslamah attested to this. But by this time the choices offered by the rebels amounted to only the resignation or abdication of Uthman and selection of another caliph. As turmoil broke out, Ali left. He seems to have broken with Uthman in despair over his own inability to break the influence of Marwan on the caliph. Ali intervened only after being informed that the rebels were preventing the delivery of water to the besieged caliph. He tried to mitigate the severity of the siege by his insistence that Uthman should be allowed to have water. He also sent his two sons to protect Uthman's house when he was in danger of being attacked.

== Assassination ==
The situation worsened on Thursday, 16 June. As Uthman stood in his balcony, Niyar ibn Iyad al-Aslami, a companion of Muhammad, lectured him from outside and demanded his abdication. In response, one of Marwan's servants threw a stone killing Niyar. Outraged by Uthman's refusal to hand over the attacker, the rebels started preparations to attack. (Note: According to one version, the trigger of the attack was the news that Uthman's governors in Iraq, Syria, and Egypt had sent him reinforcements. The rebels then hastened to finish him before the arrival of the reinforcements.) The next day, Friday 17 June, they attacked his house setting the doors on fire. Uthman ordered his defenders to lay down their arms and not fight as he did not want bloodshed. Nevertheless, some of them, including Marwan and Sa'id ibn al-As, refused and counter-attacked the rebels repelling them from one of the doors. A few of the defenders were killed in the skirmishes whereas Marwan and Sa'id were wounded. Abd Allah ibn al-Zubayr and Hasan ibn Ali are also reported to have been wounded, although other reports indicate that the two had laid down their arms on Uthman's earlier orders.

While Uthman and his wife Na'ila bint al-Furafisa were alone in their room around the time of midday prayers, reading the Qur'an, some of the rebels climbed the surrounding homes and leaped into Uthman's. According to the family tradition of Amr ibn Hazm, after that, Muhammad ibn Abi Bakr seized Uthman's beard and shook it. Uthman implored him to let it go, stressing that his father, Abu Bakr, would never have done anything like that. Muhammad retorted that Abu Bakr would have surely condemned Uthman if he had seen the deeds Uthman had committed. Then, as Uthman sought God's protection from Muhammad, Muhammad pierced Uthman's head with a blade. Kinana ibn Bishr al-Tujibi then joined in by piercing under Uthman's ear from behind with arrows and sword blows. According to a variant account, Kinana hit him with a metal rod and he fell on the ground. Sudan ibn Humran then killed him. In both accounts, Amr ibn al-Hamiq then sat on his chest and pierced his body a number of times. The house was then looted. Uthman's body was buried at night in the Jewish cemetery named Hashsh Kawkab, for the rebels (or, according to Wellhausen, Ansar) did not allow him be buried in the Muslim cemetery.

== Aftermath ==
The assassination of Uthman created an immediate crisis regarding the legal succession of the Caliphate. While Ali was elected in Medina, the circumstances of the transition were marked by the presence of the rebel factions who remained in the city. The primary point of contention following the murder was the lack of an immediate trial for those responsible, which became the central grievance for Uthman's relatives and several senior companions.

Uthman's kinsman Mu'awiya, the governor of Syria, alongside the companions Talha and al-Zubayr, demanded qisas (retribution) for the murder before recognizing the new administration. The grievance was publicized through the display of Uthman's bloodied shirt and the severed fingers of his wife, Na'ila, in the mosque of Damascus. This dispute over the priority of justice for Uthman versus the establishment of a new government led directly to the First Fitna, resulting in the Battle of the Camel and the Battle of Siffin.

== See also ==
- Uprisings against Uthman (654–656)

== Sources ==
- Donner, Fred M. (2010). Muhammad and the Believers, at the Origins of Islam. Harvard University Press. ISBN 978-0-674-05097-6.
- El-Hibri, Tayeb (2010). Parable and Politics in Early Islamic History: The Rashidun Caliphs. New York: Columbia University Press. ISBN 9780231150828.
- Hawting, Gerald R. (2000). The First Dynasty of Islam: The Umayyad Caliphate AD 661–750 (Second ed.). London and New York: Routledge. ISBN 0-415-24072-7.
- Hinds, Martin (1971). "Kufan Political Alignments and their Background in the Mid-Seventh Century A.D.". International Journal of Middle East Studies. 2 (4): 346–367. doi:10.1017/S0020743800001306. JSTOR 162722. S2CID 155455942.
- Hinds, Martin (1972). "The Murder of the Caliph 'Uthman". International Journal of Middle East Studies. 3 (4): 450–469. doi:10.1017/S0020743800025216. JSTOR 162492. S2CID 159763369.
- Holt, P.M.; Lewis, Bernard (1977). Cambridge History of Islam, Vol. 1. Cambridge University Press. ISBN 0-521-29136-4.
- Humphreys, R. Stephen, ed. (1990). The History of al-Ṭabarī, Volume XV: The Crisis of the Early Caliphate: The Reign of ʿUthmān, A.D. 644–656/A.H. 24–35. SUNY Series in Near Eastern Studies. Albany, New York: State University of New York Press. ISBN 978-0-7914-0154-5.
- Kennedy, Hugh (2016). The Prophet and the Age of the Caliphates: The Islamic Near East from the 6th to the 11th Century (Third ed.). Abingdon, Oxon and New York: Routledge. ISBN 978-1-138-78761-2.
- Levi Della Vida, G. & Khoury, R.G. (2000). "Ut̲h̲mān b. ʿAffān". In Bearman, P. J.; Bianquis, Th.; Bosworth, C. E.; van Donzel, E. & Heinrichs, W. P. (eds.). The Encyclopaedia of Islam, Second Edition. Volume X: T–U. Leiden: E. J. Brill. pp. 946–949. ISBN 978-90-04-11211-7.
- Lewis, Bernard (2002). Arabs in History. Oxford: Oxford University Press. ISBN 9780191647161.
- Madelung, Wilferd (1997). The Succession to Muhammad: A Study of the Early Caliphate. Cambridge: Cambridge University Press. ISBN 0-521-64696-0.
- Poonawala, I.K. (1982). "'Alī b. Abī Ṭāleb I. Life". Encyclopaedia Iranica (online ed.).
- Wellhausen, Julius (1927). The Arab Kingdom and Its Fall. Translated by Margaret Graham Weir. Calcutta: University of Calcutta.
