= Hujr ibn Adi =

Early Islamic figure and partisan of Ali

Ḥujr ibn ʿAdī al-Kindī حُجْر بن عَدِيّ ٱلْكِنْدِيّ
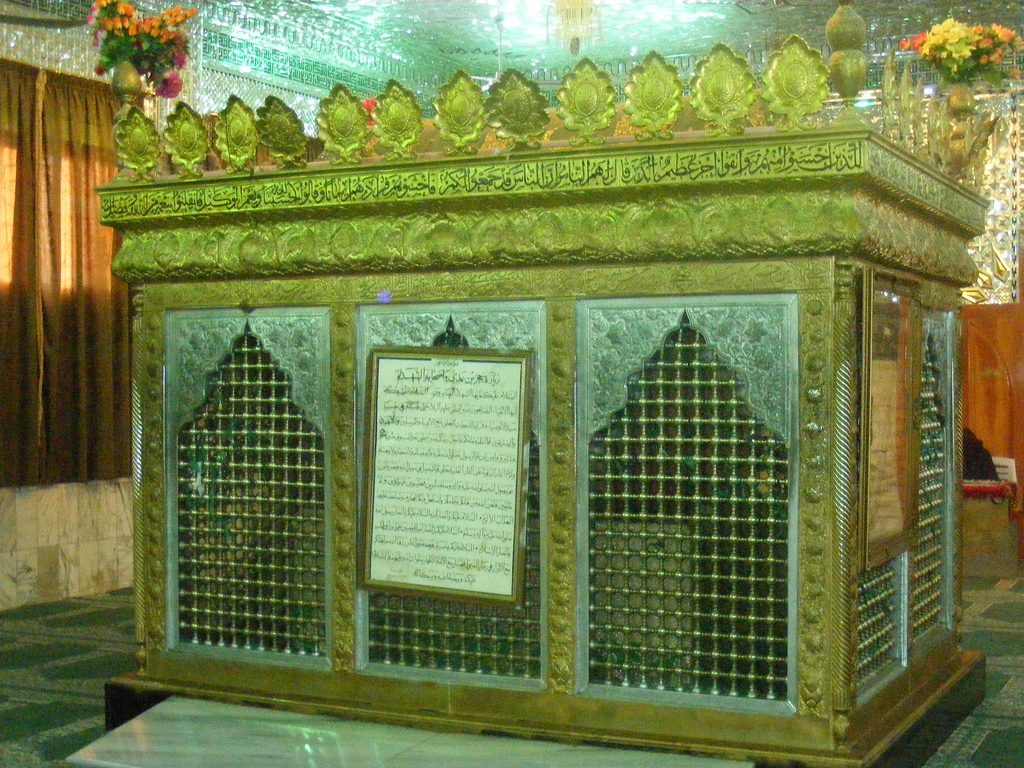
- The tomb of Ḥujr ibn ʿAdī al-Kindī in Adra.
- Title: al-Kindī ("The Kindite")

Personal life
- Died: c. 670
- Resting place: Adra, Syria
- Region: Levant
- Known for: Revolution and opposition against Muʿāwiya

Religious life
- Religion: Islam

Muslim leader
- Teacher: ʿAlī ibn Abī Ṭālib

Ḥujr ibn ʿAdī al-Kindī (Arabic: حُجْر بن عَدِيّ ٱلْكِنْدِيّ) was a Muslim revolutionary and a supporter of ʿAlī ibn Abī Ṭālib, the fourth Rashidun caliph and the first Imam of the Shi'ites. He was known for rallying against Muʿāwiya, the first Umayyad Caliph and opponent of Ali, which ultimately led to his execution in the 670s.

== Biography ==
Hujr ibn Adi was from the tribe of Kinda, as indicated by his epithet al-Kindi, and claimed descent from the ancient Sabaeans of Yemen. His position in the Islamic historical record is widely agreed to have been as one of the Tabi'un, putting him in the second generation of Muslims who did not meet Muhammad. However, Ibn Sa'd and Ahmad al-Baladhuri disagree with this and state that he was one of the Sahabah, basing their statement on a narration which says that Hujr and his brother accepted Islam in the city of Medina while in the presence of Muhammad himself. Hujr took part in the 7th-century conquests of the Levant under the service of the first two Rashidun caliphs, Abu Bakr and Umar ibn al-Khattab.

=== Revolutionary career and death ===
During the First Fitna, Hujr ibn Adi supported Ali ibn Abi Talib and gained prominence as a revolutionary for rallying against Mu'awiyah and the newly formed Umayyad Caliphate. During the Friday sermon of Ziyad ibn Abihi, Hujr reportedly threw stones at him and abandoned the gathering. His motives for such an action are disputed; according to Ibn al-Arabi, Hujr threw stones at Ziyad after hearing of unsatisfying actions done by the latter; while an earlier narration states that Hujr threw the stones out of anger due to the fact that Ziyad had extended his speech during the Friday sermon and Hujr felt it was taking too long. Regardless, Mu'awiyah, who did not fully understand the situation, saw this as a means of inciting rebellion and he had Hujr executed. The execution of Hujr ibn Adi earned Mu'awiyah the criticism of both supporters and opponents of Ali, such as Aisha, who was reportedly displeased with him until Mu'awiyah explained himself to her.

The date of death of Hujr has been traditionally dated to year 53 of the Islamic calendar, which corresponds to 671–673 CE.

== Legacy ==
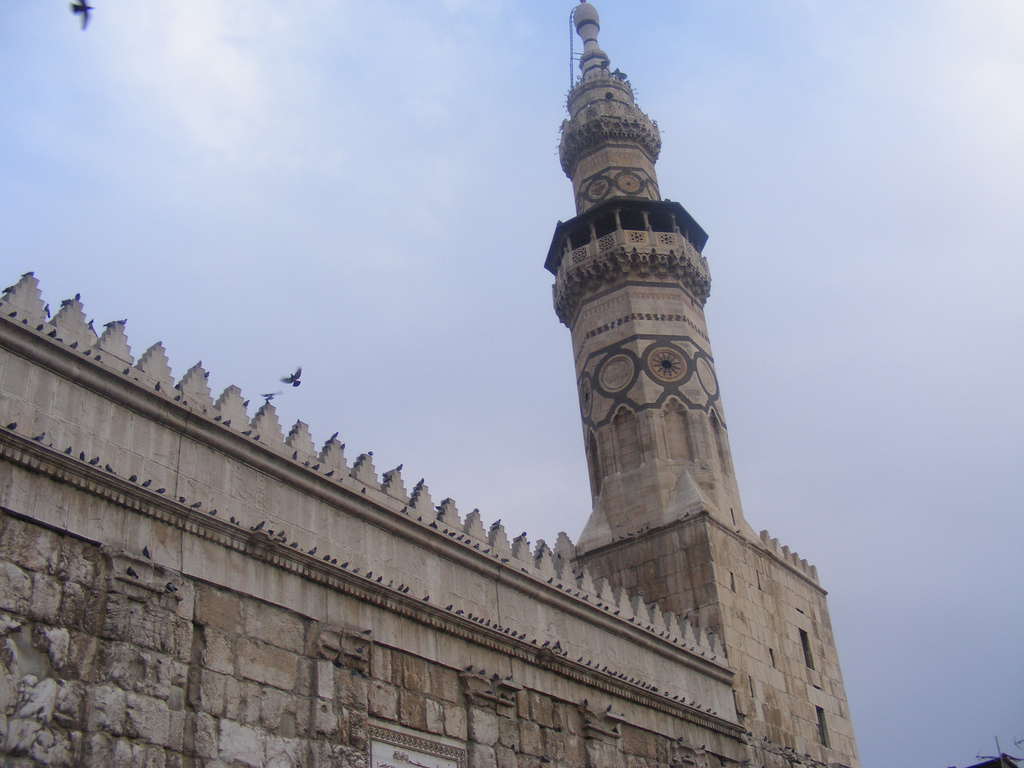
The minaret of the mosque built around the purported tomb of Hujr by the Ayyubids.

Hujr ibn Adi became a revered figure to the early Shi'ites. The Ayyubids, a Sunni dynasty, built a mosque around his alleged tomb that was renovated in 1205. The mosque and its tomb became notable for the fact that it used materials from an earlier Roman ruin in the area, such as pillars and bricks. This mosque, despite its Sunni origins, became a place of pilgrimage for Twelver Shi'ites.

== Desecration of tomb ==
On 2 May 2013, Islamist group Jabhat al-Nusra attacked the mosque of Hujr ibn Adi in Adra, Syria and desecrated the tomb. The New York Times identified Abu Anas al-Wazir, a lieutenant of the Islamist group, as the perpetrator behind the desecration. Shi'ite news agencies, surveying the site, observed that the grave had been emptied and photographs of the exhumed grave were published online where they became widespread. However, after being arrested, members of Jabhat al-Nusra who participated in the desecration admitted that they had not exhumed any remains and there was no body found inside the tomb. Images of the so-called body were also spread online but were debunked as it was merely the picture of an unidentified Sunni man who was killed in a revolt against the Alawite government. After the fall of the Assad rule over Syria, the mosque of Hujr ibn Adi was rebuilt and reopened to visitors.

== See also ==
- List of Sahabah
- Tabi'un
