= Abd al-Rahman ibn Khalid =

Arab governor of Homs (c.616-666)

ʿAbd al-Raḥmān ibn Khālid عبد الرحمن بن خالد

Governor of Jund Hims
- In office 653–666
- Monarch: Mu'awiya I
- Succeeded by: Nu'man ibn Bashir

Personal details
- Born: c. 616 Mecca, Hejaz, Arabia
- Died: c. 666 (aged 49–50) Bilad al-Sham, Umayyad Caliphate (now Syria)
- Resting place: Khalid ibn al-Walid Mosque, Homs
- Relations: Muhajir (brother); Sulayman (brother)
- Children: Khalid ibn Abd al-Rahman
- Parent(s): Khalid ibn al-Walid; Asma bint Anas ibn Mudrik

Military service
- Allegiance: Rashidun Caliphate; Umayyad Caliphate
- Years of service: 644–666
- Battles/wars: First Fitna; Siege of Harran; Battle of Siffin; Arab–Byzantine wars

Abd al-Rahman ibn Khalid ibn al-Walid (Arabic: عَبْدُ الرَّحْمَن بْنِ خَالِد بْنِ الْوَلِيد, romanized: ʿAbd al-Raḥmān ibn Khālid ibn al-Walīd; 616–666) was the governor of Homs under caliphs Uthman (r. 644–656) and Mu'awiya I (r. 661–680). During Mu'awiya's governorship of Syria (639–661), Abd al-Rahman commanded a number of campaigns against the Byzantine Empire and defended the Upper Mesopotamian frontier from the Iraq-based forces of Caliph Ali (r. 656–661). He fought reputably against the latter at the Battle of Siffin in 657 and continued his governorship of Homs and campaigns against the Byzantines after Mu'awiya became caliph in 661. His battlefield reputation and descent from his father, the prominent general Khalid ibn al-Walid, made him particularly popular among the Arabs of Syria. Mu'awiya ultimately perceived him as a potential rival of his own son Yazid, who he was grooming as his successor, which led the caliph to allegedly order Abd al-Rahman's poisoning in 666.

== Life ==
=== Early life and governorship under Uthman ===
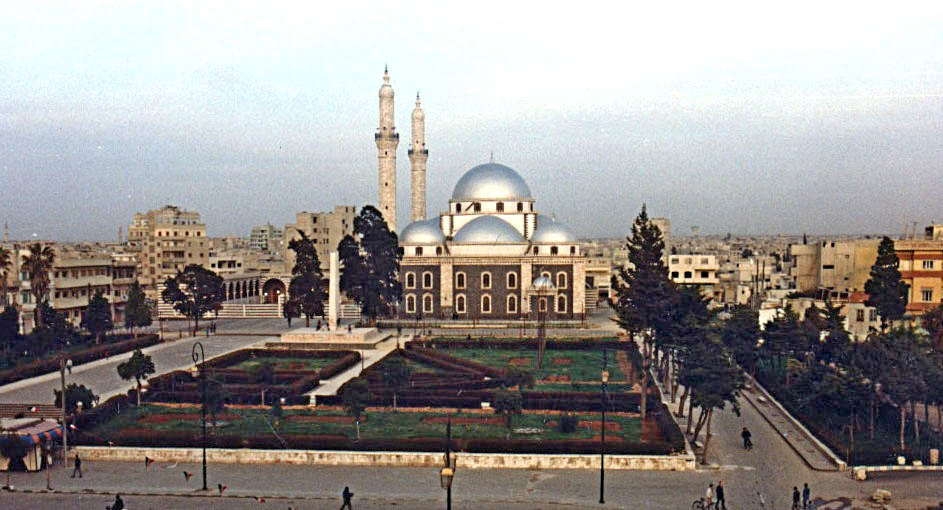
The Khalid ibn al-Walid Mosque in Homs, where Abd al-Rahman is believed to have been buried

Abd al-Rahman was born in c. 616, the son of the prominent Muslim general and member of the Qurayshi clan of Banu Makhzum, Khalid ibn al-Walid. Abd al-Rahman's mother was Khalid's wife Asma, the daughter of Anas ibn Mudrik, a prominent chieftain and poet of the Khath'am tribe who was active during the pre-Islamic period and died several years after the advent of Islam in the 620s. Abd al-Rahman likely entered military service during the caliphate of Uthman (r. 644–656). During Uthman's reign, he was appointed the governor of Jund Hims (military district of Homs) by Mu'awiya ibn Abi Sufyan, the overall governor of the province of Syria. Abd al-Rahman was dispatched by Mu'awiya to command a number of military campaigns against the Byzantines in Anatolia and was referred to in the Greek sources "Abderachman".

=== First Fitna and campaigns against Ali ===
He fended off a raid against Mu'awiya's territory in the Jazira (Upper Mesopotamia) by the Iraqi forces of Caliph Ali (r. 656–661) in 657. After Malik al-Ashtar pushed back Al-Dahhak ibn Qays al-Fihri at the Battle of Marj Marina, Mu'awiya dispatched Abd al-Rahman with a cavalry detachment, prompting al-Ashtar to withdraw from the environs of Harran and Raqqa. Later that year, Abd al-Rahman served as a commander in the Syrian army of Mu'awiya against Ali at the Battle of Siffin, where he fought with distinction and held the banner of the Syrians. His brother Muhajir fought for Ali's side in the same battle and was killed. During the subsequent arbitration talks in Adhruh or Dumat al-Jandal in 658 or 659 between the representatives of Ali and Mu'awiya, Abd al-Rahman was among those in the latter's faction to witness the arbitration document.

=== Later career and death ===
Abd al-Rahman continued as governor of Jund Hims during the caliphate of Mu'awiya beginning in 661. In 664/665 and 665/666, he led the winter campaigns against the Byzantines along the Anatolian front. According to the Muslim traditional sources, Abd al-Rahman posed a threat to Mu'awiya's ambitions to appoint his own Yazid as his successor and the caliph resolved to eliminate him. At the time, he was the last surviving son of Khalid ibn al-Walid and his descent from the reputable general, as well as his own valor and effectiveness fighting the Byzantines, had endeared him to the Syrian Arabs. To that end, Mu'awiya allegedly had his Christian physician, Ibn Uthal, poison Abd al-Rahman upon the latter's return to Homs from the Byzantine front in 666. The physician was later killed by a kinsman of Abd al-Rahman called Khalid, who was either his son or the son of his brother Muhajir. This Khalid was consequently imprisoned and fined Ibn Uthal's blood money by Mu'awiya to protect him from potential retaliation. Relations between the influential Banu Makhzum, who were mostly concentrated in the Hejaz (western Arabia), and Mu'awiya deteriorated as a result of Abd al-Rahman's alleged poisoning. The Orientalist historian Henri Lammens doubts the reliability of the narrative, which he relates to the anti-Christian violence in Homs around that time. Abd al-Rahman's son Khalid was a commander of a naval campaign against the Byzantines in 668 or 669.

The line of Khalid ibn al-Walid died out with the deaths of Abd al-Rahman's roughly forty male descendants as a result of a plague in Syria toward the end of the Umayyad period (661–750). Abd al-Rahman is buried alongside his father and one of his father's wives, Fadda, in Homs. In 1908, the Ottoman rulers of Syria built the Khalid ibn al-Walid Mosque around the site claimed since at least the 12th century to contain their graves.

== Bibliography ==
- Blackburn, Richard (2005). Journey to the Sublime Porte: The Arabic Memoir of a Sharifian Agent's Diplomatic Mission to the Ottoman Imperial Court in the Era of Suleyman the Magnificent. Orient-Institut. ISBN 9783899134414.
- Crone, P. (1978). "Khālid b. al-Walīd". In van Donzel, E.; Lewis, B.; Pellat, Ch. & Bosworth, C. E. (eds.). The Encyclopaedia of Islam, Second Edition. Volume IV: Iran–Kha. Leiden: E. J. Brill. pp. 928–929. ISBN 978-90-04-05745-6. OCLC 758278456.
- Della Vida, G. Levi (1978). "Khathʿam". In van Donzel, E.; Lewis, B.; Pellat, Ch. & Bosworth, C. E. (eds.). The Encyclopaedia of Islam, Second Edition. Volume IV: Iran–Kha. Leiden: E. J. Brill. pp. 1105–1106. ISBN 978-90-04-05745-6. OCLC 758278456.
- Blankinship, Khalid Yahya, ed. (1993). The History of al-Ṭabarī, Volume XI: The Challenge to the Empires. SUNY Series in Near Eastern Studies. Albany, New York: State University of New York Press. ISBN 978-0-7914-0851-3.
- Gibb, H. A. R. (1960). "ʿAbd al-Raḥmān b. Khālid b. al-Walīd". In Gibb, H. A. R.; Kramers, J. H.; Lévi-Provençal, E.; Schacht, J.; Lewis, B. & Pellat, Ch. (eds.). The Encyclopaedia of Islam, Second Edition. Volume I: A–B. Leiden: E. J. Brill. p. 85. OCLC 495469456.
- Graebner, Michael David (1975), The Role of the Slavs Within the Byzantine Empire, 500–1018, Rutgers University Press
- Hawting, G. R., ed. (1996). The History of al-Ṭabarī, Volume XVII: The First Civil War: From the Battle of Siffīn to the Death of ʿAlī, A.D. 656–661/A.H. 36–40. SUNY Series in Near Eastern Studies. Albany, New York: State University of New York Press. ISBN 978-0-7914-2393-6.
- Hinds, M. (1991). "Makhzūm". In Bosworth, C. E.; van Donzel, E. & Pellat, Ch. (eds.). The Encyclopaedia of Islam, Second Edition. Volume VI: Mahk–Mid. Leiden: E. J. Brill. pp. 137–140. ISBN 978-90-04-08112-3.
- Humphreys, R. Stephen, ed. (1990). The History of al-Ṭabarī, Volume XV: The Crisis of the Early Caliphate: The Reign of ʿUthmān, A.D. 644–656/A.H. 24–35. SUNY Series in Near Eastern Studies. Albany, New York: State University of New York Press. ISBN 978-0-7914-0154-5.
- Jankowiak, Marek (2013). "The First Arab Siege of Constantinople". In Zuckerman, Constantin (ed.). Travaux et mémoires, Vol. 17: Constructing the Seventh Century. Paris: Association des Amis du Centre d'Histoire et Civilisation de Byzance. pp. 237–320. ISBN 978-2-916716-45-9.
- Morony, Michael G., ed. (1987). The History of al-Ṭabarī, Volume XVIII: Between Civil Wars: The Caliphate of Muʿāwiyah, 661–680 A.D./A.H. 40–60. SUNY Series in Near Eastern Studies. Albany, New York: State University of New York Press. ISBN 978-0-87395-933-9.
- Madelung, W. (1997). The Succession to Muḥammad: A Study of the Early Caliphate. Cambridge University Press. ISBN 978-0-521-64696-3.
