= Muhajir ibn Khalid =

Arab military leader, Son of Khalid ibn al-Walid (died 657)

Muhajir ibn Khalid الْمُهَاجِر بْنِ خَالِد
- Arabic: الْمُهَاجِر بْنِ خَالِد بْنِ الْوَلِيد, romanized: Al-Muhājir ibn Khālid ibn al-Walīd
- Born: c. 620–629; Mecca, Arabia
- Died: 28 July 657; Kufa, Rashidun Caliphate
- Children: Khalid ibn Muhajir
- Relatives: Khalid ibn al-Walid (father); Asma bint Anas ibn Mudrik (mother); Abd al-Rahman (brother); Banu Makhzum (clan)
- Military career
- Allegiance: Rashidun Caliphate
- Branch: Caliphal army
- Service years: 650–657
- Rank: Soldier
- Conflicts: First Fitna; Battle of Siffin †

Al-Muhajir ibn Khalid ibn al-Walid (Arabic: الْمُهَاجِر بْنِ خَالِد بْنِ الْوَلِيد, romanized: Al-Muhājir ibn Khālid ibn al-Walīd, died 657) was an Arab soldier in the army of Caliph Ali (r. 656–661) and son of the prominent general Khalid ibn al-Walid. He died in the Battle of Siffin.

== Life ==
Muhajir was a son of Khalid ibn al-Walid, a member of the Banu Makhzum and a leading general of the early Muslim conquests. Unlike his paternal brother Abd al-Rahman, Muhajir supported Caliph Ali (r. 656–661) in the First Fitna and died fighting against the army of Ali's principal enemy, the governor of Syria and future founder of the Umayyad Caliphate Mu'awiya ibn Abi Sufyan, at the Battle of Siffin in the summer of 657. After Abd al-Rahman was alleged to have been poisoned to death on Mu'awiya's orders in 666/67, Muhajir's son Khalid from Mecca killed his uncle's alleged poisoner Ibn Uthal in Syria, was arrested and released after paying blood money. Khalid ibn Muhajir was also a poet and sided with Abd Allah ibn al-Zubayr, a rival claimant to the caliphate, against the Umayyads during the Second Fitna.

== Bibliography ==
- Arafat, W. (1967). "Notes and Communications". Bulletin of the School of Oriental and African Studies. 30 (3): 681–684. JSTOR 612395.
- Hinds, M. (1991). "Makhzūm". In Bosworth, C. E.; van Donzel, E. & Pellat, Ch. (eds.). The Encyclopaedia of Islam, Second Edition. Volume VI: Mahk–Mid. Leiden: E. J. Brill. pp. 137–140. ISBN 978-90-04-08112-3.
- Kilpatrick, Hilary (2003). Making the Great Book of Songs: Compilation and the Author's Craft in Abû I-Faraj al-Isbahânî's Kitâb al-aghânî. London: Routledge. ISBN 0-203-22061-7.
