= Nakha (tribe) =

Arab tribe of Yemen

Nakha' نخع
- Qahtanite
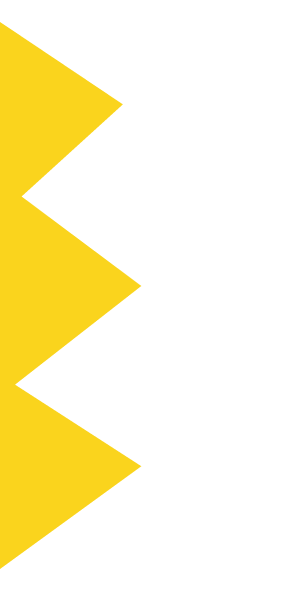
- Banner of Nakha' at the Battle of Siffin
- Location: Yemen
- Parent tribe: Madh'hij
- Branches: Banu Malik
- Religion: Paganism, later Islam

The Nakha (Arabic: النُخَع), also sometimes referred to as Nukha, were an Arab tribe of Yemen. They were a branch of the larger Madh'hij tribe. They were converted to Islam by Muadh ibn Jabal during the 7th century, during which they participated in the Islamic conquests. Notable Nakha historical figures include Malik ibn al-Harith, Alqama ibn Qays, and al-Nakhai.

Al-Hamdani mentioned the Nukha tribe in his book Sifat Jazirat al Arab (Description of the Arabian Peninsula) (900 AD).
