= Battle of Marj Marina (657) =

Battle of the First Fitna

- Part of First Fitna
- Map of the Jazira region
Date	Early 657
Location	Jazira
Result	Victory for Ali

Belligerents
Rashidun Caliphate	Umayyad Syria

Commanders and leaders
Ali ibn Abi Talib; Malik al-Ashtar	Mu'awiya ibn Abi Sufyan; Al-Dahhak ibn Qays

Strength
Unknown	700+

Casualties and losses
Unknown	Unknown

The Battle of Marj Marina was fought in 657 CE during the First Fitna between the forces of the fourth Rashidun caliph, Ali ibn Abi Talib, and the forces of the Umayyad governor of Syria, Mu'awiya ibn Abi Sufyan, for control of the region of al-Jazira. The dispute escalated into a military confrontation, which resulted in both forces being forced to retreat.

== Background ==
After the assassination of the third Rashidun caliph Uthman ibn Affan, Ali ibn Abi Talib was chosen in Medina to succeed Uthman as caliph, but Ali's authority was rejected by Uthman's kinsman and the long-time governor of Syria, Mu'awiya ibn Abi Sufyan, who also controlled the region of al-Jazira.

After Ali emerged victorious at the Battle of the Camel, Mu'awiya appointed his subordinate al-Dahhak ibn Qays as his governor of the Jazira, which encompassed the towns of Harran, Circesium, Ruha and Raqqa, where a significant population of Uthmanids had settled.

After establishing his capital at Kufa, Ali in turn appointed his own lieutenant Malik al-Ashtar as his own governor of al-Jazira. During the civil war, the Uthmanid Simak ibn Makhrama fled to Raqqa along with one hundred men under his command and pledged to offer support to Mu'awiya. Later another seven hundred men of his tribe fled to Raqqa.

== Battle ==
Malik al-Ashtar advanced towards Harran in order to meet this threat, and in response Mu'awiya sent al-Dahhak ibn Qays to halt al-Ashtar's advance. The two armies met Marj Marina, located between Raqqa and Harran, and clashed for a day until al-Dahhak's forces were routed to the fortified town of Harran.

== Aftermath ==
After al-Dahhak retreated to Harran, Malik al-Ashtar pursued him and laid siege to Harran. To aid the defenders, Mu'awiya dispatched Abd al-Rahman ibn Khalid, his governor of Homs. Upon hearing about the incoming reinforcements, al-Ashtar retreated by the route of Raqqa and Circesium. The two towns then armed themselves against al-Ashtar, who was routed to Mosul.

== See also ==
- Battle of the Camel
- Battle of Siffin
- Umayyad annexation of Egypt
