= Fatima bint Qays =

Female companion of Prophet Muhammad

Fatima bint Qays (Arabic: فاتىمە بىنت قەيس) was a scholar in the early days of Islam.

== History ==
Fatima was the daughter of Qays ibn Khalid and the sister of Al-Dahhak ibn Qays al-Fihri. She was of elite status from the Adnanite tribe of Quraysh and a scholar in the early days of Islam.

Qays married Abu Amr ibn Hafs ibn Mughira from the Quraysh sub-tribe Bani Makhzūm. Her husband irrevocably divorced her three times, while he was away campaigning in Yemen.

After her divorce, two men of good standing, Mu‘awiyah ibn Abi Sufyan and Abu Jahm, both proposed to her. She is said to have consulted with Muhammad, who advised her to marry his companion (sahabi) Usama ibn Zayd instead. When Hazrat Umar was martyred, the Shura Council gathered in their home.

Qays also consulted with Muhammad about zakat (obligatory almsgiving), one of the Pillars of Islam.
