= Khalid ibn al-Walid Mosque =

Mosque in Homs, Syria

- مَسْجِد خَالِد ٱبْن ٱلْوَلِيد
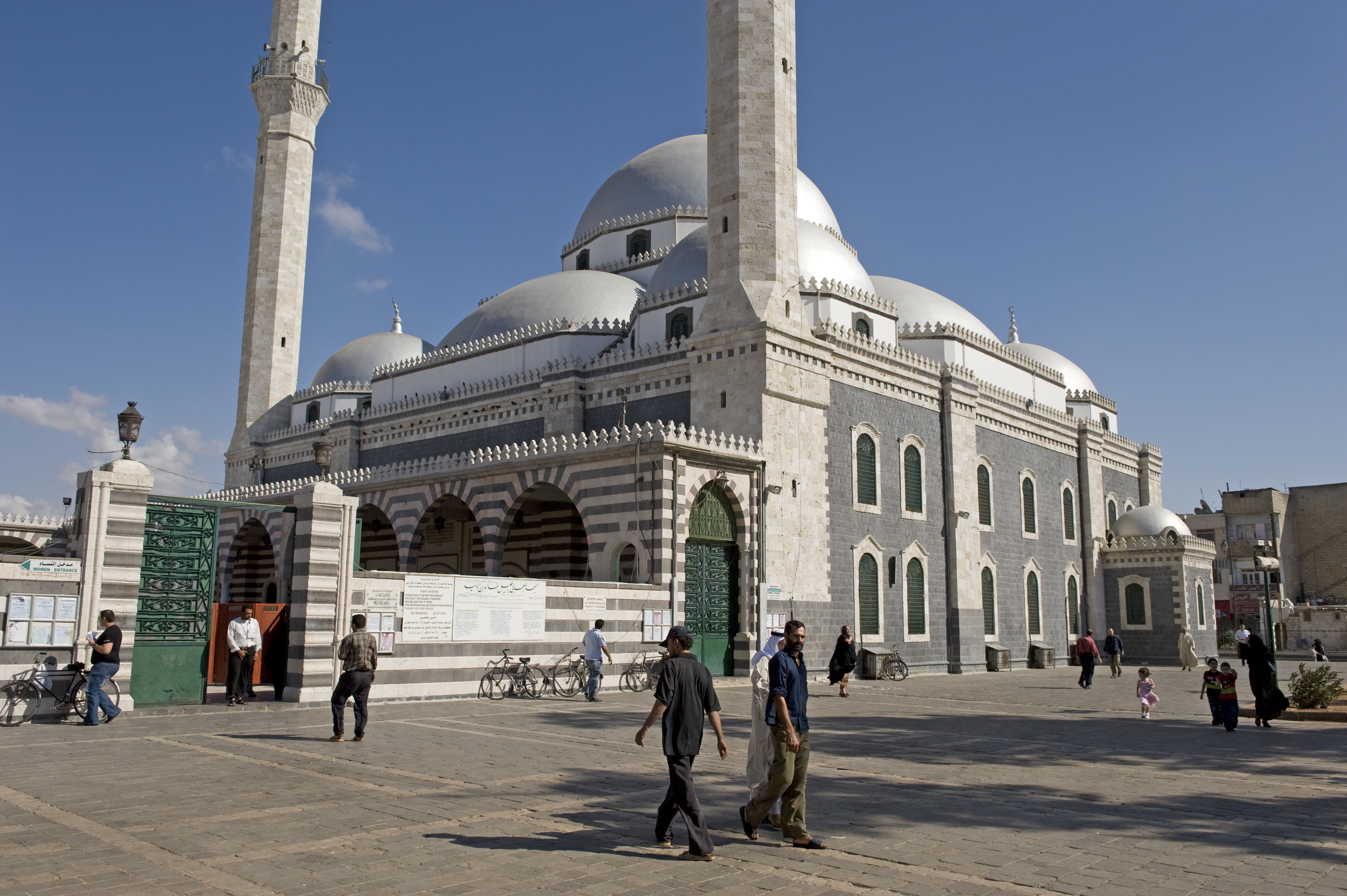
- The mosque in 2009

- Location of the mosque in Syria

Religion
- Affiliation: Sunni Islam
- Ecclesiastical or organisational status: Mosque and mausoleum
- Status: Active

Location
- Location: Khaldiyah, Homs
- Country: Syria
- Interactive map of Khalid ibn al-Walid Mosque
- Coordinates: 34°44′12″N 36°42′56″E

Architecture
- Architect: Abdallah Ulsun
- Type: Mosque
- Style: Mamluk, Ottoman
- Established: 1265
- Completed: 1912

Specifications
- Dome: 10
- Minaret: 2
- Materials: Stone; masonry

The Khalid ibn al-Walid Mosque (Arabic: مَسْجِد خَالِد ٱبْن ٱلْوَلِيد, romanized: Masjid Khālid ibn al-Walīd) is a mosque in Homs, Syria, located in a park along Hama Street in ash-Shuhada ("Martyrs") Square.

The mosque is dedicated to Khalid ibn al-Walid, an Arab military commander who led the Muslim conquest of Syria in the 7th century following the decisive Battle of Yarmouk, which put an end to Byzantine rule in Syria. His dome-topped mausoleum is located in a corner of the prayer hall and has served as a pilgrimage center. Two tall minarets, with narrow galleries constructed of alternating horizontal rows of white and black stone, are situated at the building's northwestern and northeastern corners and reflect the traditional Islamic architecture style of the Levant.

== Location ==
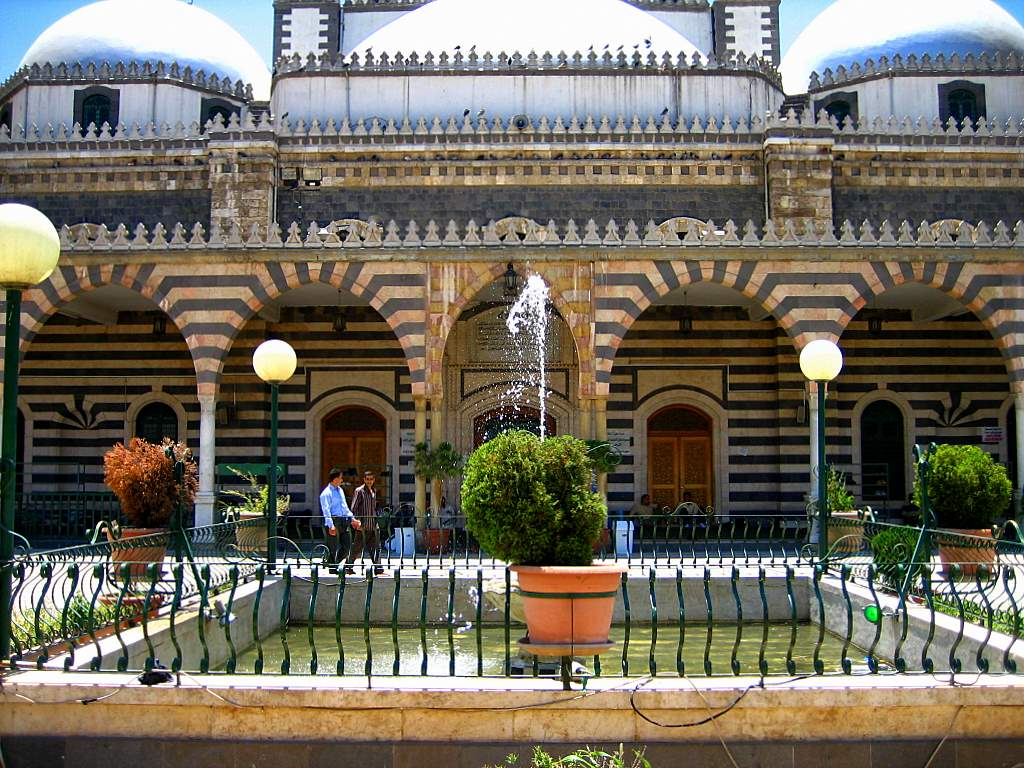
The courtyard of the mosque displays Mamluk architectural style

The mosque is located in the Khaldiya district of Homs, the third largest city in Syria. It is situated in a park alongside Hama Street about 500 metres (1,600 ft) north of Shoukri al-Quwatli Street, 400 metres (1,300 ft) southwest of the National Hospital, and 300 metres (980 ft) from the souk at ash-Shouhada Square.

Mamluk ablaq-style stonework is used in the courtyard. The old cemetery, which at one time surrounded the mosque, was moved and in its place a large garden has been created.

== History ==
A small mosque was supposedly built adjacent to the mausoleum of Khalid ibn al-Walid in the 7th century. The current interior shrine that contains Khalid's tomb dates to the 11th century, and is considered to be a "significant pilgrimage center."

Several sources state that the Khalid ibn al-Walid Mosque was originally built around Khalid's mausoleum during the reign of Mamluk sultan al-Zahir Baybars in 1265. The building was later restored during the reign of Mamluk sultan al-Ashraf Khalil in 1291. According to local tradition, when Tamerlane invaded Syria in the early 15th century, he spared Homs from destruction because it contained the mosque and the mausoleum of Khalid ibn al-Walid, whom he held in great regard in light of Khalid's role as a companion of Islamic prophet Muhammad and a commander of the Muslim Arab army that conquered the city of Damascus and Byzantine Syria.

Throughout the 17th and 18th centuries, during Ottoman rule, the Dandan family, the most prominent clan of the Arab Bani Khalid tribe, held a stake in the extended revenue shares of the mausoleum and the mosque. The Bani Khalid claimed descent from Khalid and the accompanying tribes that participated in the conquest of Syria under his command. However, their claim of ancestry had been previously refuted by the Mamluk-era historian al-Qalqashandi.

The present-day mosque was built in the early 20th century, although some sources claim it dates to the late 19th century. Nazim Hussein Pasha, the Ottoman governor of Syria between 1895 and 1909, during the reign of Sultan Abd al-Hamid II, ordered the demolition of the Mamluk-era mosque for renovation. The renovation was completed in 1912, after Hussein Pasha's term as governor ended. Thus, the current Khalid ibn al-Walid Mosque is of relatively recent construction and is noted for its Ottoman architectural style. According to historian David Nicolle, the mosque's construction by the Ottoman government was an attempt to maintain the allegiance of the increasingly restive Arab inhabitants of Syria. In later years Khalid was adopted as a hero and symbol of Arab nationalism.

=== Modern era ===
As of 2007, activities in the mosque were organized by shaykhs Haytham al-Sa'id and Ahmad Mithqan. Stamps depicting the mosque have been issued in several denominations.

The Khalid ibn al-Walid Mosque has been a symbol of anti-government rebels during the Syrian civil war. According to The New York Times, Syrian security forces killed ten protesters participating in a funeral procession as they were leaving the mosque on 18 July 2011. The mosque, which the Syrian government stated had been turned by the rebels into an "arms and ammunition depot", was abandoned by the rebels on 27 July 2013. Shelling by government forces damaged Khalid's tomb inside the mosque. Following its capture by the Syrian Army, state media showed heavy damage inside the mosque, including some parts of it being burned, and the door to the tomb destroyed. It was reopened by Chechen leader Ramzan Kadyrov who repaired the mosque.

== Architecture ==
The mosque is built in the "Ottoman style" but incorporates the local usage of Ablaq; the alternating bands of black and white stone. It is distinguished by its two tall, white stone minarets, which have narrow galleries constructed of white and black stone, laid in alternate horizontal rows. Situated at the building's northwestern and northeastern comers, they reflect a traditional Islamic architectural style of the Levant. The minarets and the window frames are made of white limestone. The building's metal central dome is silver in color and reflects sunlight. It is supported by four massive columns, built in Mamluk ablaq style. In addition to the large central dome, there are nine smaller domes.

A large prayer hall forms much of the interior. The walls are made of basalt stone, a building material which is widely available in Homs. The mausoleum of Khalid ibn al-Walid is in one corner. Khalid's tomb contains an ornate dome and interiors that depict over 50 victorious battles that he commanded. His son is buried next to him. A wooden sarcophagus carved with Kufic inscriptions and quoting the Quran was placed over the grave of Khalid. During renovation, the sarcophagus was moved to the National Museum in Damascus.

A corner of the mosque also includes a small sarcophagus covered in green cloth, believed to be a tomb of Ubayd Allah ibn Umar.

== Gallery ==
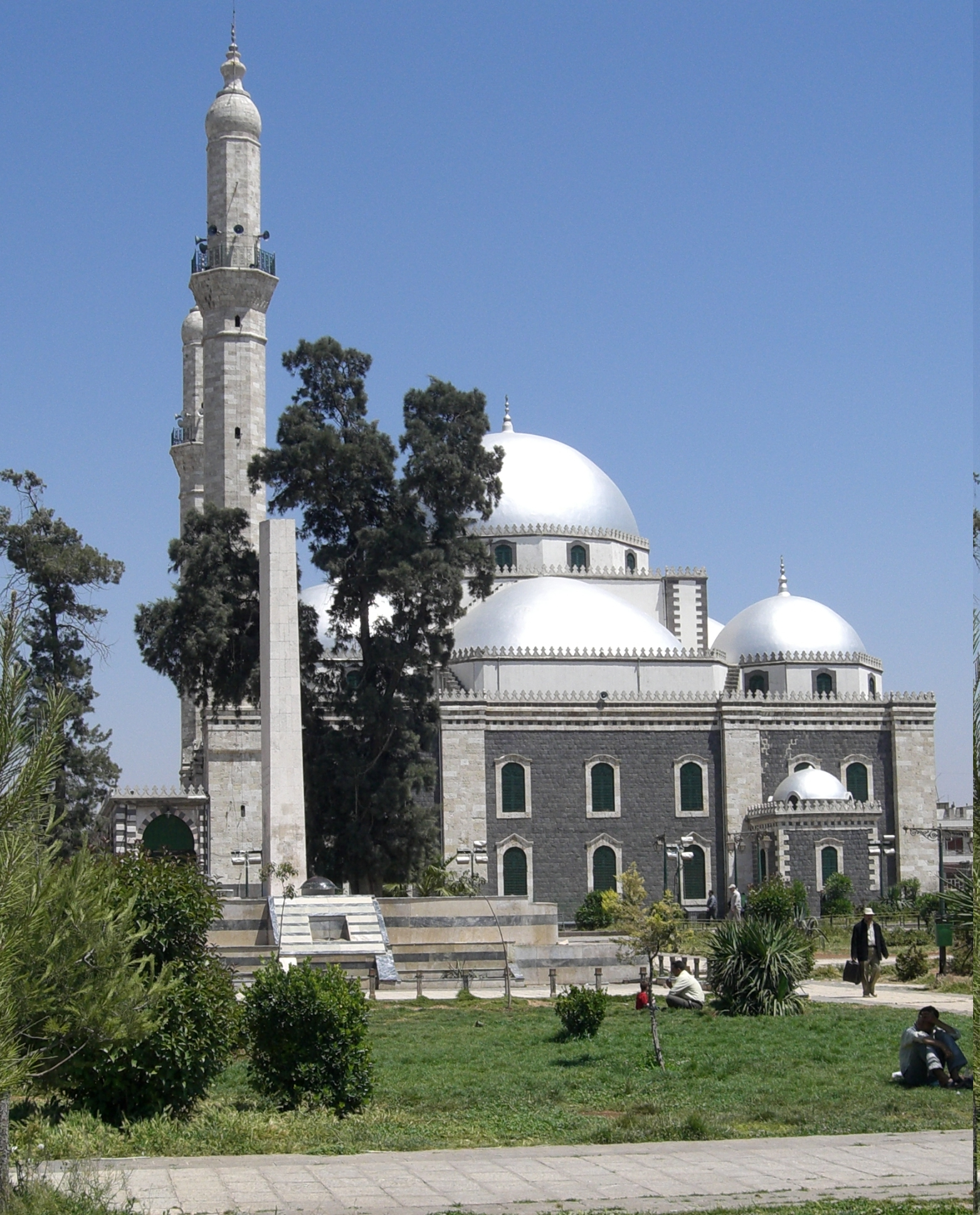
Exterior of the mosque

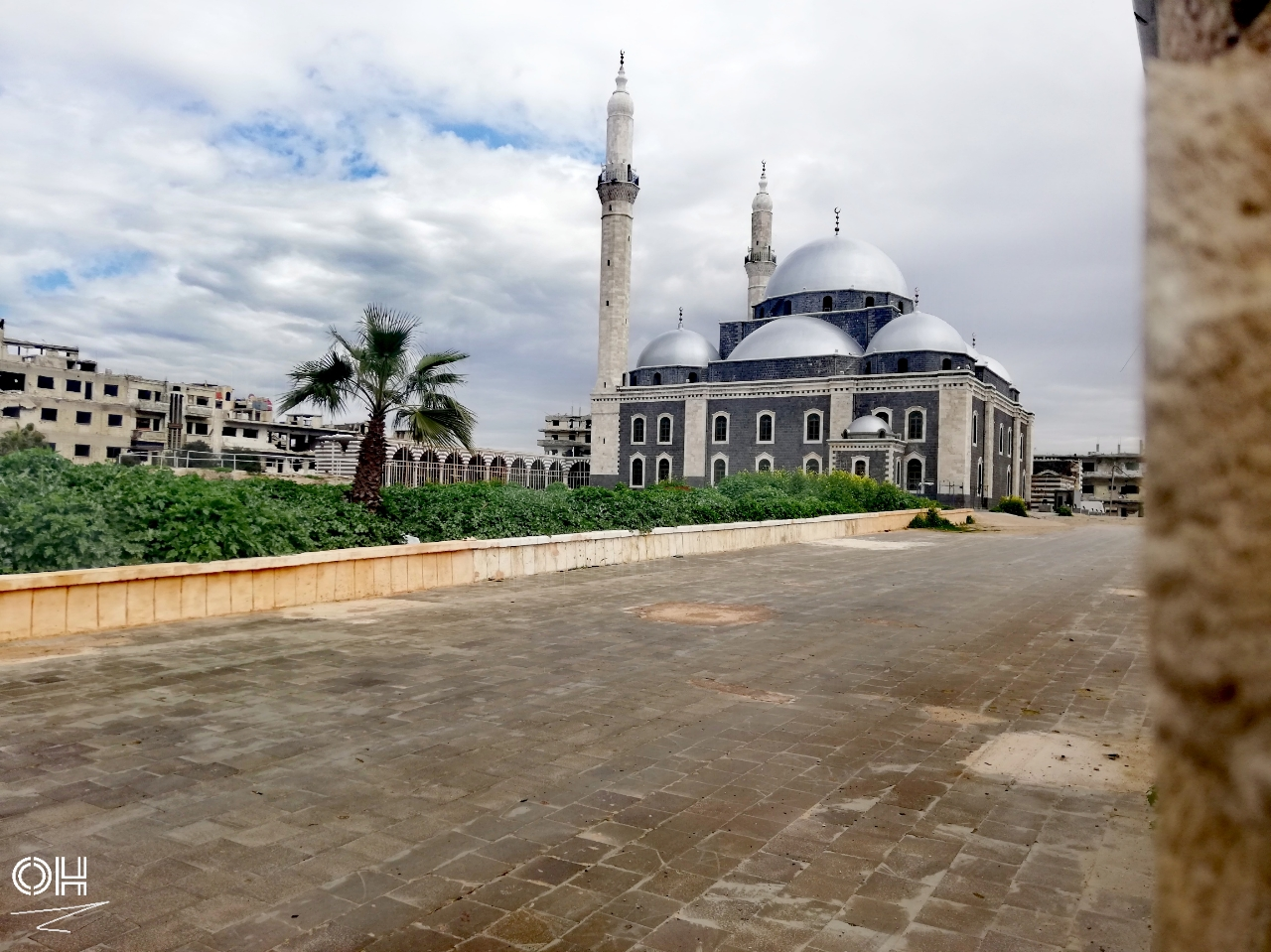
Exterior of the mosque

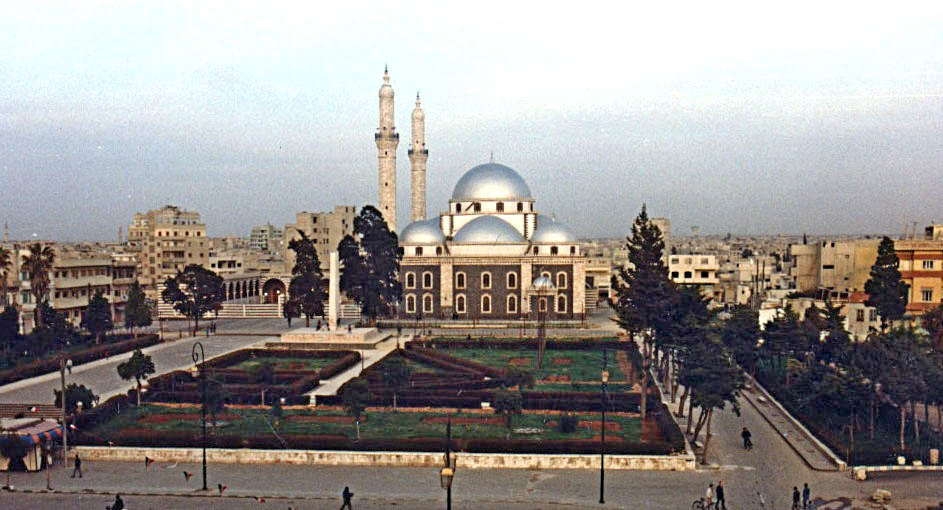
The mosque in 2008

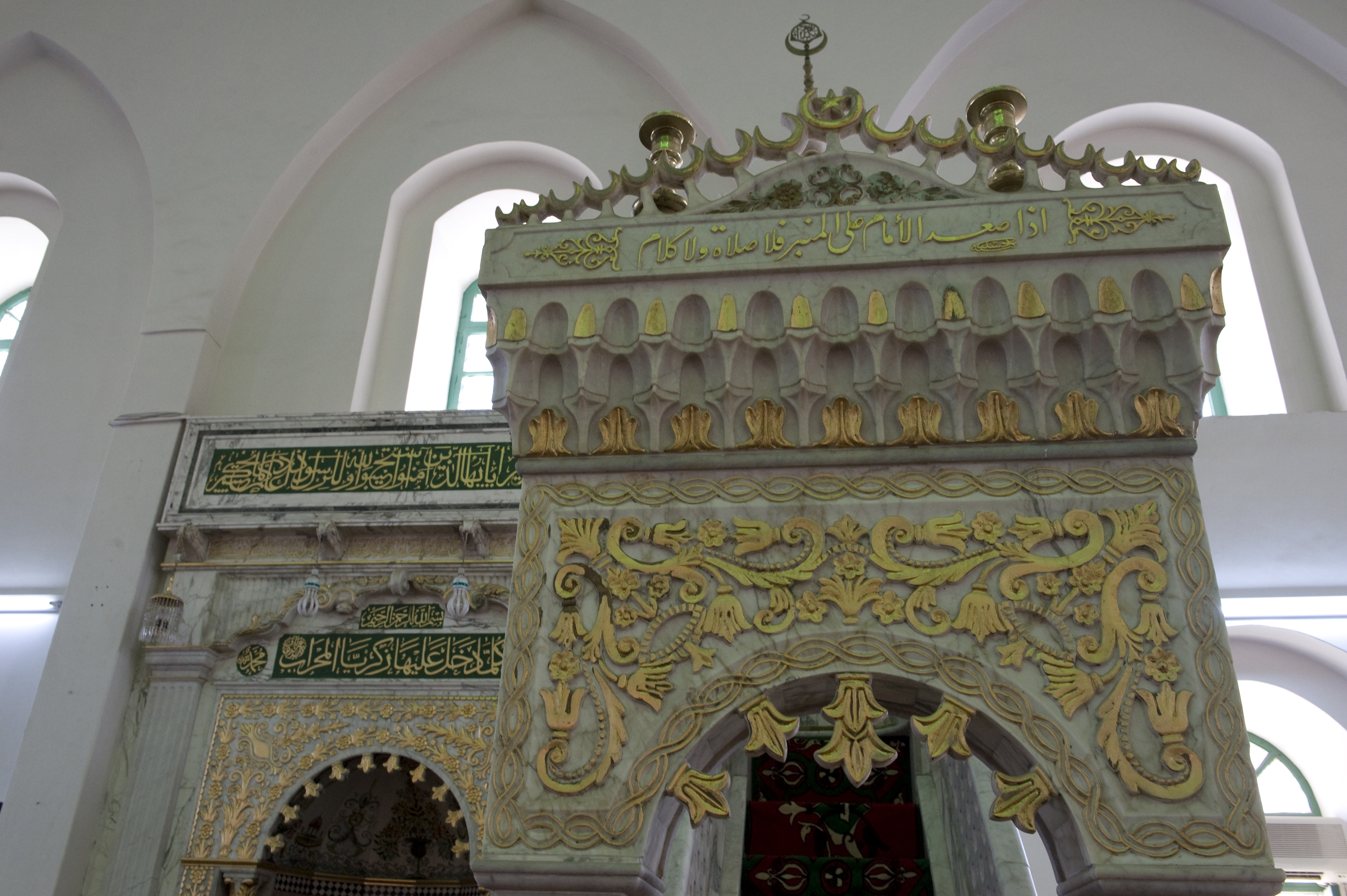
The minbar and the mihrab

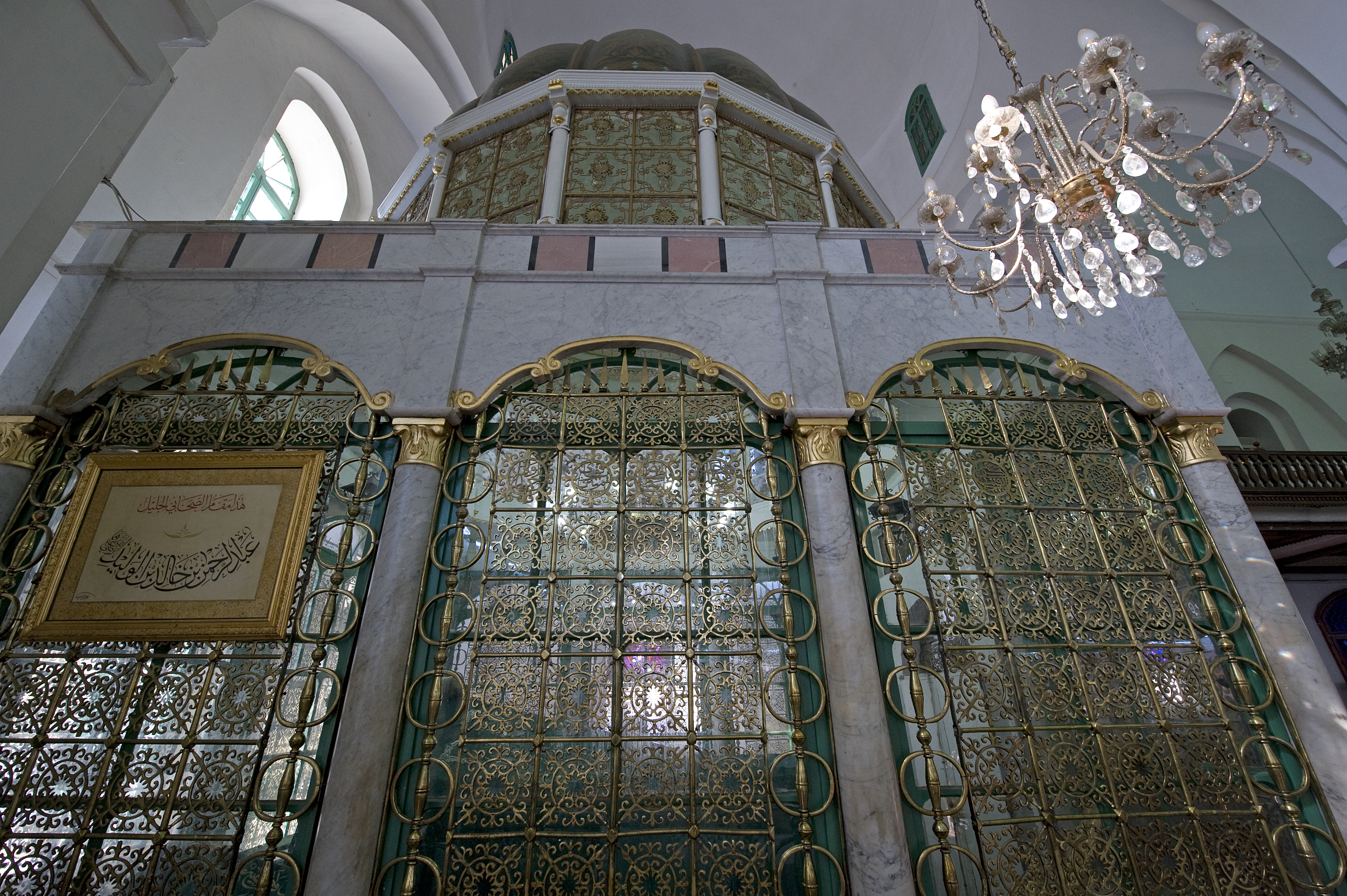
The mausoleum of Abd al-Rahman ibn Khalid

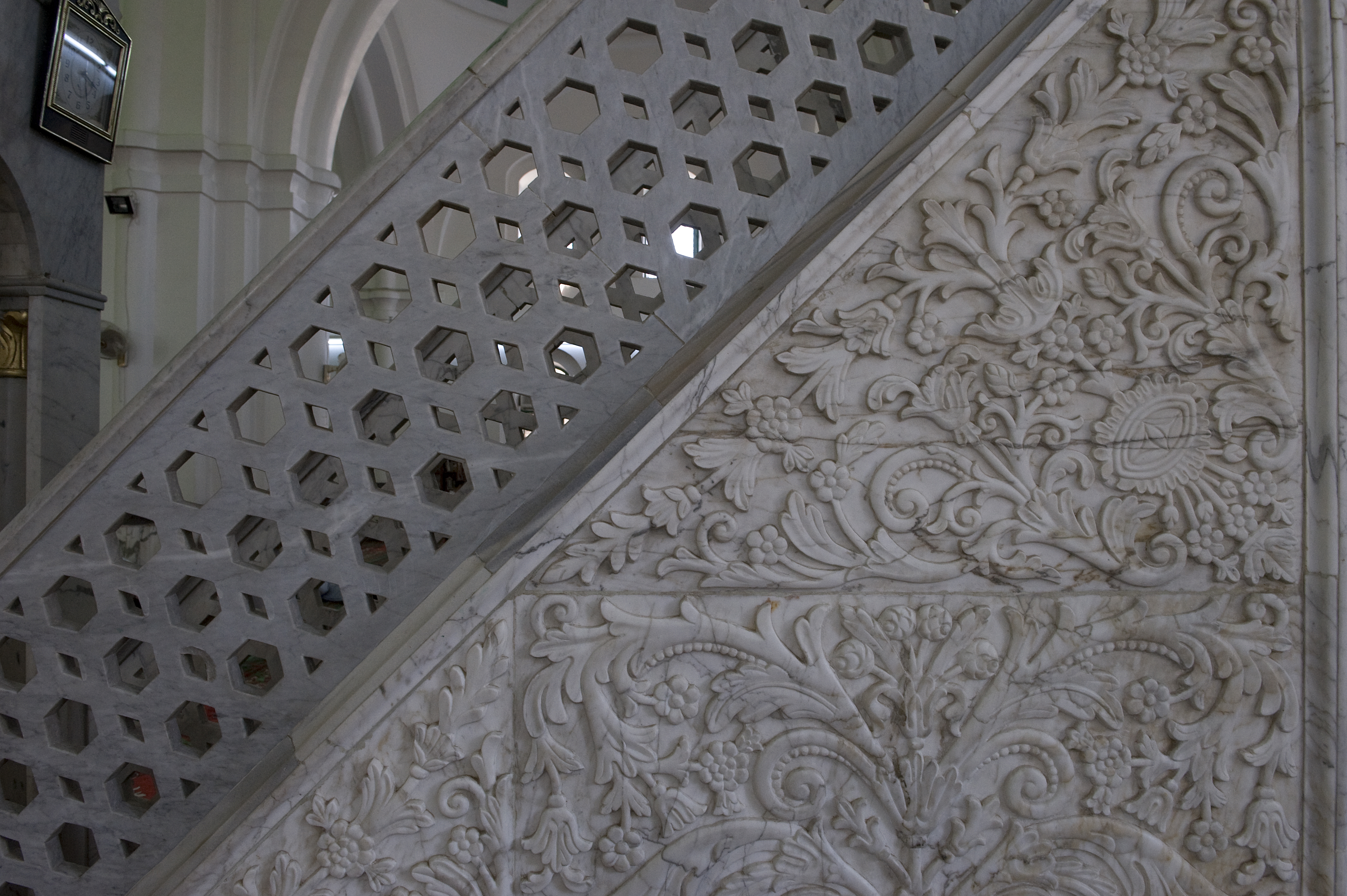
Details on the minbar

== See also ==
- Sunni Islam in Syria
- List of mosques in Syria
