= Al-Dahhak ibn Qays al-Fihri =

Umayyad general and governor of Damascus (died 684)

Al-Dahhak ibn Qays al-Fihri الضَّحَّاك بْنِ قَيْس الْفِهْرِيّ

Umayyad governor of Damascus
- In office 680–684
- Monarchs: Yazid I (r. 680–683); Mu'awiya II (r. 683–684)

Umayyad governor of Kufa
- In office 675–678
- Monarch: Mu'awiya I (r. 661–680)
- Preceded by: Abdallah ibn Khalid ibn Asid
- Succeeded by: Abd al-Rahman ibn Umm al-Hakam al-Thaqafi

Personal details
- Died: 18 August 684 Marj Rahit, north of Damascus, Umayyad Caliphate
- Children: Abd al-Rahman
- Parent: Qays al-Fihri
- Relatives: Fatima bint Qays (sister)

Military service
- Allegiance: Umayyad Caliphate (657–684); Zubayrid Caliphate (684)
- Years of service: 656–684
- Battles/wars: First Fitna; Battle of Marj Marina; Battle of Siffin; Second Fitna; Battle of Marj Rahit †

Al-Dahhak ibn Qays al-Fihri (Arabic: الضَّحَّاك بْنِ قَيْس الْفِهْرِيّ, romanized: Al-Ḍaḥḥak ibn Qays al-Fihrī; died August 684) was an Umayyad general, head of security forces and governor of Damascus during the reigns of caliphs Mu'awiya I, Yazid I and Mu'awiya II. Though long an Umayyad loyalist, after the latter's death, al-Dahhak defected to the anti-Umayyad claimant to the caliphate, Abd Allah ibn al-Zubayr.

== Life ==
Al-Dahhak ibn Qays al-Fihri was a chieftain of the Fihr clan of the Quraysh. He belonged to the Banu Muharib ibn Fihr line. Al-Dahhak was an early supporter of Mu'awiya ibn Abi Sufyan, the Muslim governor of Syria, and served as his ṣāḥib al-shurṭa (head of security forces or select troops). Mu'awiya later appointed him governor of Jund Dimashq (military district of Damascus). In 656, al-Dahhak's reinforcements forced Malik al-Ashtar, a partisan of Caliph Ali, to retreat to Mosul. At the Battle of Siffin between Mu'awiya and Ali, al-Dahhak commanded the former's Syrian infantry. He was then dispatched against Ali's supporters in the Hejaz, but his 3,000-strong force was repelled by Ali's lieutenant Hujr ibn Adi al-Kindi.

Mu'awiya appointed al-Dahhak governor of Kufa, one of the two main Arab garrison towns of Iraq, in 673/74 or 674/75, but removed him from office three or four years later. When Mu'awiya was on his deathbed in 680, he made al-Dahhak and Muslim ibn Uqba his regents and instructed them to secure the succession of his son Yazid I. Al-Dahhak led prayers of the dead for Mu'awiya and helped ensure Yazid's accession; in turn, the latter confirmed al-Dahhak as governor of Jund Dimashq. Yazid died in 683 and was replaced by his son Mu'awiya II, who fell fatally ill several weeks later. Before he died, Mu'awiya II selected al-Dahhak to lead the Muslim prayer in Damascus in his place until a new caliph acceded.

In the ensuing chaos following the death of Mu'awiya II, who had no suitable successor, al-Dahhak secretly defected to Abd Allah ibn al-Zubayr. The latter was the head of a rival caliphate to the Umayyads based in Mecca. Al-Dahhak soon after publicly declared support for Ibn al-Zubayr, who not only recognized his governorship of Damascus, but also gave him authority over the pro-Zubayrid governors of Hims and Qinnasrin. Afterward, a champion of the Umayyad cause, the general Ubayd Allah ibn Ziyad, persuaded al-Dahhak to return to the Umayyad fold and proposed that he become the chieftain of all the Quraysh. This change of heart proved temporary as al-Dahhak's partisans were adamant in their support for Ibn al-Zubayr's bid for the caliphate, particularly in the absence of a suitable Umayyad candidate. Meanwhile, Ubayd Allah, with the backing of Mu'awiya's traditional backers, Ibn Bahdal of the Banu Kalb and the chieftains of the Quda'a and Yemenite tribes, put forth the Umayyad elder Marwan ibn al-Hakam as their candidate for the caliphate.

Al-Dahhak left Damascus to marshal the pro-Zubayrid Qaysi tribes at Marj Rahit, a plain north of the city. Meanwhile, Ubayd Allah entered the city and had Marwan recognized as the new caliph in the Friday prayer. Marwan and his backers, mainly the Banu Kalb, then confronted al-Dahhak's troops. In the ensuing twenty-day Battle of Marj Rahit in late 684, al-Dahhak was slain and his troops were decisively defeated. One of his sons, Abd al-Rahman, later returned to the good graces of the Umayyads and served as the governor of Medina under Caliph Yazid II (r. 720–724). Some structures associated with al-Dahhak survived centuries after his death, including his home and bathhouse in Damascus which was noted by the 12th century historian Ibn Asakir and a mosque at the southern wall of the Citadel of Damascus recognized by the 16th-century historian al-Almawi.

== Bibliography ==
- Dietrich, A. (1965). "Al-Dahhak ibn Kays al-Fihri". In Lewis, B.; Pellat, Ch. & Schacht, J. (eds.). The Encyclopaedia of Islam, Second Edition. Volume II: C–G. Leiden: E. J. Brill. pp. 89–90. OCLC 495469475.
- Donner, Fred M. (1981). The Early Islamic Conquests. Princeton: Princeton University Press. ISBN 978-1-4008-4787-7.
- Ibn 'Abd Rabbih (2011). Boullata, Emeritus Issa J. (ed.). The Unique Necklace, Volume III. Reading: Garnet Publishing Limited & Southern Court. ISBN 978-1-85964-240-5.
- Theophilus of Edessa (2011). Hoyland, Robert G. (ed.). Theophilus of Edessa's Chronicle and the Circulation of Historical Knowledge in Late Antiquity and Early Islam. Liverpool: Liverpool University Press. ISBN 978-1-84631-697-5.
