= John Kelsay =

American academic

John Kelsay is an author and a Research Professor and Richard L. Rubenstein Professor of Religion at Florida State University. He received his Ph.D. in 1985 in Ethics from University of Virginia. He mainly focuses on religious ethics, particularly in relation to the Islamic and Christian traditions. His research interests include comparative religious ethics, political ethics, and religion and war.

Kelsay's 1993 book, Islam And War: A Study in Comparative Ethics, discussed the Islamic concept of jihad as compared with the Christian concept of just war. His 2007 book, Arguing the Just War in Islam, was praised by The New York Times for helping to bring greater understanding of Islamic views of war and peace to the non-Islamic world.

In 2007, Kelsay visited Oman and urged students there to challenge fellow Muslims who used the concept of jihad to justify acts of violence.

He has assumed the editorship of the interdisciplinary journal Sounding, which has moved to Florida after 25 years at the University of Tennessee.

== Publications ==
=== Books ===
- Human Rights and the Conflict of Cultures (co-authored; University of South Carolina, 1988)
- Just War and Jihad (co-edited; Greenwood Press, 1991)
- Islam and War: A Study in Comparative Ethics (Westminster/John Knox, 1993)
- Arguing the Just War in Islam (Harvard University Press, 2007)

=== Articles ===
- "Islam and the Comparative Study of Religious Ethics: Review of Selected Materials, 1985-1995," in Religious Studies Review 23.1 (January 1997): 3-9.
- "Bin Ladin's Reasons," in Christian Century 119.5 (February 27-March 6, 2002): 26-29.
