= Conquest of Caesarea Maritima (634–641) =

Siege of the Arab–Byzantine wars

- Part of the Muslim conquest of Syria (Arab–Byzantine wars)
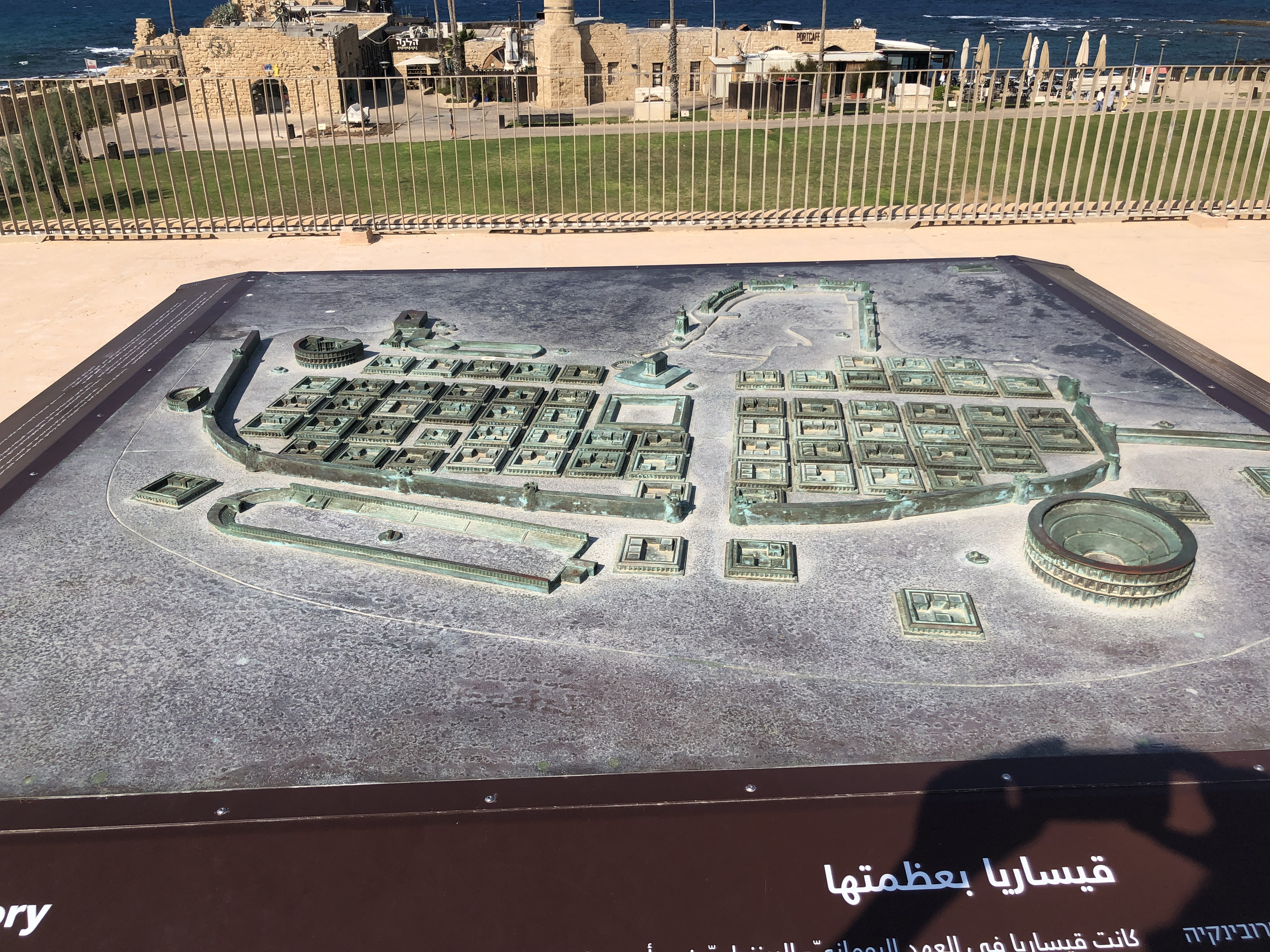
- Reconstruction of Caesarea Maritima
Date	July 634 – May 641
Location	Caesarea Maritima
Result	Rashidun victory
Territorial changes	Caesarea captured by the Rashidun Caliphate

Belligerents
Rashidun Caliphate	Byzantine Empire

Commanders and leaders
Yazid ibn Abi Sufyan # Muʿawiya ibn Abī Sufyan; Amr ibn al-As; Habib ibn Maslama al-Fihri	Unknown

Strength
17,000 men 72 siege engines	7,000 men (In 640)

Casualties and losses
Unknown	Entire force killed 4,000 captured

The Conquest of Caesarea Maritima was a military engagement between the Rashidun Caliphate and the Byzantine garrison of Caesarea. During the early Muslim conquests, the Levant was conquered, with the city of Caesarea showing resistance from 634 before eventually falling in 641.

== Background ==
After the last war between Byzantium and Persia, a new force emerged in the theater. In the Arabian Peninsula, a new religion rose. The prophet Muhammad united the Arab tribes. The Muslims began their conquests in Persia, defeating them at Qadisiyyah. The Byzantines would be defeated at Yarmuk. The Muslims conquered the majority of the Levant. The city of Caesarea Maritima would be the last to fall to the Muslims.

== Conquest ==
In July 634, the Rashidun Caliph, Umar, ordered the Muslim general, Amr ibn al-As, to besiege the city. The siege was not continuous, and at times the Muslim forces were called away to fight in more hard battles against the Byzantines. At the later stages of the siege, Yazid ibn Abi Sufyan would join Amr for the conquest. The Muslims had a force of 17,000 men. The vanguard was led by Habib ibn Maslama al-Fihri. The vanguard was close to the city; there they met the Byzantine infantry and cavalry, who attacked the Muslims with arrows and bolts, forcing them to retreat. Until then, the Muslims retreated to the camp, and there, they regrouped and attacked the Byzantines, which forced them to retreat back to the city.

After this battle, the Muslims placed the city under siege. Amr decided to leave the siege with his 3,500 men. Seeing this, the Byzantines decided to attack under the impression that the Muslims were inactive. They prepared their battle formations and attacked the Muslims. They successfully reached the Muslim camp before any response came. Yazid attacked the Byzantines, buying time for the rest of the army to counter-attack. The Muslim infantry and cavalry repelled the Byzantines, killing 5,000 of their troops while the rest retreated to the city.

In 639, Yazid fell ill or had enough of the siege. He was replaced by his brother, Muʿawiya ibn Abī Sufyan. In 640, the Byzantine garrison was said to have 7,000 men. Yazid soon died. Mu'awiya started the operations in December 640. Mu'awiya was determined to conquer the city. He brought 72 siege engines and bombarded it day and night. According to Al-Baladhuri, a local Jew assisted the Muslims by guiding them into the city through a tunnel, which may have been a Roman aqueduct. Another account mentions that the Muslims discovered a secret postern in the walls. According to old accounts, the city was defended by consisted of 700,000 paid Byzantine soldiers, 30,000 Samaritans and 200,000 Jews, of which 4,000 were captured and enslaved after the fall of the city. Whatever the case, the Muslims successfully captured the city. The fighting raged for three days; all the 7,000 men who protect the city, saving those who escaped, were killed. The Muslims captured 4,000 people, the remaining portion of the inhabitants. Many of the Christian inhabitants had already escaped during the siege. The city was not razed, but the Muslims did not take it as an administrative base. The conquest of Caesarea was completed in May 641.

== Sources ==
- Si Sheppard (2020), Constantinople AD 717–18, The Crucible of History.
- Robert G. Hoyland (2015), In God's Path, The Arab Conquests and the Creation of an Islamic Empire.
- Gideon Avni (2014), The Byzantine-Islamic Transition in Palestine, An Archaeological Approach.
- Ilkka Syvänne (2022), Military History of Late Rome 602–641.
