= Malik al-Ashtar =

Arab military commander (died 658)

Mālik al-Ashtar مَالِك ٱلْأَشْتَر

Governor of Egypt (Note: Died before arriving at Fustat and did not assume the post.)
- Caliph: Ali
- Preceded by: Muhammad ibn Abi Bakr
- Succeeded by: Amr ibn al-As

Personal details
- Born: Yemen, Arabia
- Died: c. 658 Egypt, Rashidun Caliphate
- Cause of death: Assassinated en route to Fustat
- Resting place: In Cairo, Egypt
- Relations: Nakha (tribe)
- Children: Ibrahim
- Parent: al-Harith ibn ‘Abd Yaghuth (father)

Military service
- Allegiance: Rashidun Caliphate; Kufan rebels
- Rank: Field Commander
- Battles/wars: Muslim conquest of Syria; Battle of the Yarmuk; Siege of Caesarea Maritima; Muslim conquest of Mesopotamia; Uprisings against Uthman; First Fitna; Battle of the Camel; Battle of Marj Marina; Battle of Siffin; Umayyad invasions of Egypt X

Malik al-Ashtar (Arabic: مَالِك ٱلْأَشْتَر, romanized: Mālik al-Ashtar), born Mālik ibn al-Ḥārith al-Nakhaʿī al-Madhḥijī, was an Arab military commander and tribal leader of the Nakha branch of the Madhhij confederation. He first rose to prominence in Kufa as a leader of the opposition to Caliph Uthman, playing a key role in the events that led to the Caliph's death. Following the election of Ali as caliph, Malik became one of his most loyal and formidable commanders, playing a pivotal role in persuading the qurra (Quran reciters) to support Ali during the First Fitna and holding senior commands at the battles of the Camel and Siffin. In 658, while traveling to assume the governorship of Egypt, Malik was assassinated by poisoning in al-Qulzum. His death was a major strategic blow to Ali's administration and facilitated the Umayyad conquest of Egypt.

== Early life and military career ==
Malik al-Ashtar was born in Yemen and belonged to the Madhhij tribe, specifically the Banu Nakha branch. His full lineage is recorded as Malik ibn al-Harith ibn Abd Yaghuth ibn Maslama ibn Rabi'a ibn al-Harith ibn Jadhima ibn Sa'd ibn Malik ibn al-Nakha of Madhhij. Malik participated in the Muslim conquest of Syria, including the Battle of the Yarmuk. During the battle, he sustained a sword strike to the face that resulted in the permanent displacement of his eyelid. This injury earned him the epithet al-Ashtar (the one with the inverted eyelid). He also participated in the siege of Caesarea Maritima. Following the capture of Damascus, Caliph Umar ordered the Iraqi troops to return to Iraq and reinforce Sa'd ibn Abi Waqqas. Hashim ibn Utba was placed in command of the Iraqi troops, whose force numbered around ten thousand after replacements were added. Malik was among those who joined the force, alongside Qays ibn Makshuh.

== Conflicts during the reign of Uthman ==
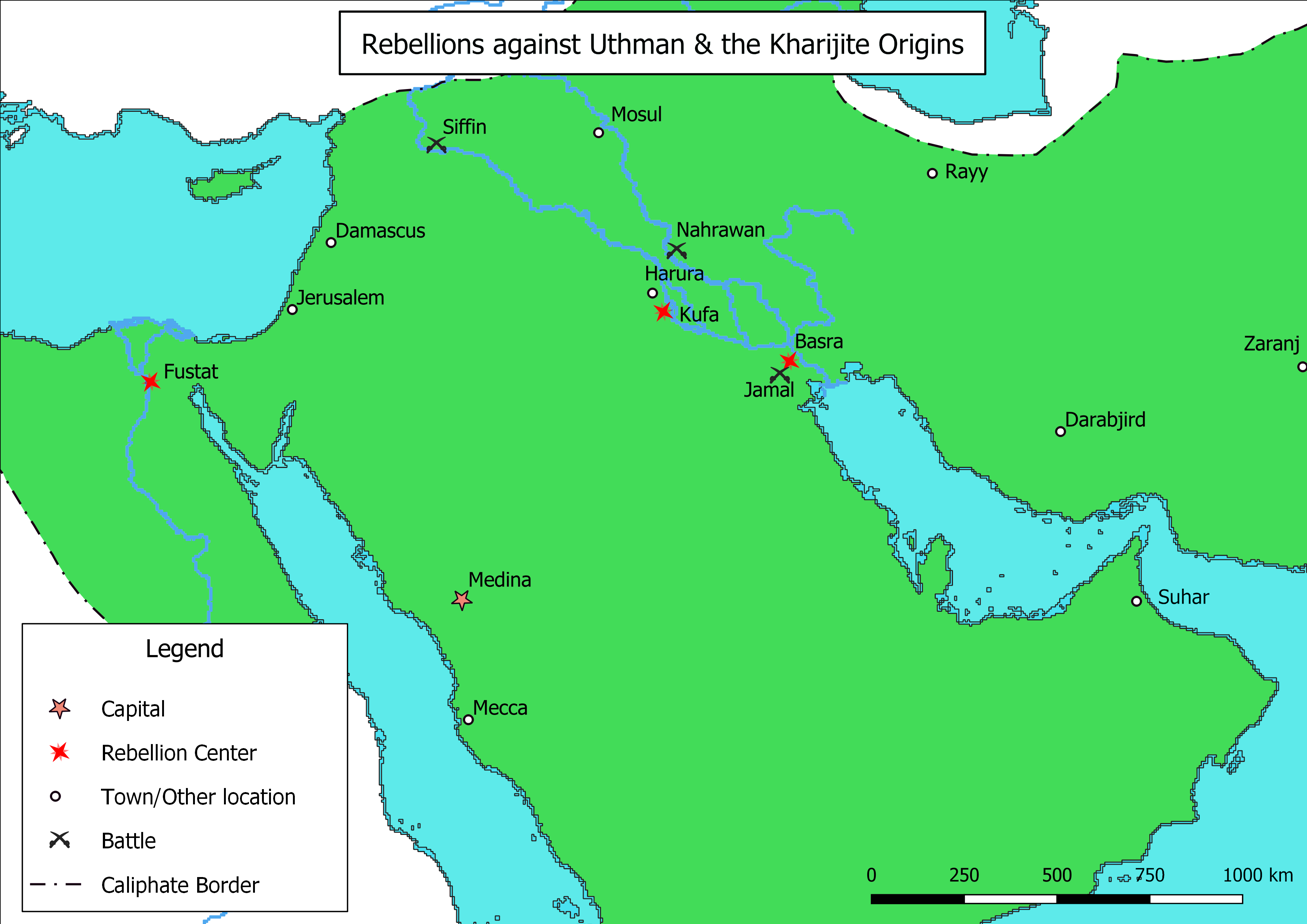
Map of the rebellions against Uthman and the Kharijite origins

=== Opposition to al-Walid ibn Uqba ===
During the caliphate of Uthman ibn Affan, Malik al-Ashtar emerged as a leading figure of the Kufan opposition and the military leader of the qurra (Quran readers). Anti-Uthman sentiment in Kufa began early in his reign, particularly during the governorship of Al-Walid ibn Uqba. Malik initially attempted to mediate between the governor and members of his tribe who had become involved in the opposition. Among those calling for Uthman's removal in favor of Ali were Amr ibn Zurara and Kumayl ibn Ziyad. When Al-Walid attempted to suppress the opposition, Malik offered to vouch for the conduct of his fellow tribesmen. Despite this, Uthman ordered Amr ibn Zurara into exile in Damascus, with Malik and other prominent Kufans accompanying him in solidarity before returning to the city.

Dissatisfaction with Al-Walid’s personal conduct further fueled the unrest. The governor was famously accused of leading the morning prayer while in a state of intoxication, reportedly vomiting in front of the worshippers and asking if they wished for him to perform additional units of prayer. This religious scandal eventually led to his dismissal.

=== Revolt against Sa'id ibn al-As ===
Under the succeeding governor, Sa'id ibn al-As, tensions shifted toward the economic control of Iraq. During evening discussions at Sa'id's residence, the governor claimed that the Sawad, the fertile lands of Iraq, was merely a garden for Quraysh. Malik indignantly countered and argued that the land was booty granted by God to the warriors who had conquered it with their swords. When the commander of Sa'id's guard, Abd al-Rahman al-Asadi, berated the group for disputing the governor, Malik reportedly incited the men to seize him. The guard commander was severely beaten and trampled until he lost consciousness.

Following this escalation, Malik and his allies were deported to Mu'awiya I in Damascus and later to Homs. Upon his return to Kufa in late 34 AH (June 655 CE), the conflict reached a turning point at the Day of al-Jar'a. Malik led a force of approximately a thousand men to the outskirts of the city, successfully blocking Sa'id ibn al-As from re-entering Kufa after the Hajj. This act of open defiance effectively overthrew the administration in the province. Under pressure from the rebels, Uthman was forced to depose Sa'id and appoint Abu Musa al-Ash'ari as governor. However, central authority in Kufa remained permanently undermined by Malik's military intervention. After organizing this opposition, Malik led the Kufan rebel force to Medina to join the Siege of Uthman.

== Service under Ali and the First Fitna ==
=== Election of Ali and the Battle of the Camel ===
Following the Assassination of Uthman, Malik al-Ashtar played a decisive role in the election of Ali as caliph. While there was some support among the Egyptian rebels for Talha ibn Ubayd Allah, the Kufan contingent led by Malik proved more influential. Malik is credited by historians as a major force in securing the oath of allegiance (Bay'ah) for Ali in Medina.

When the opposition forces of Aisha, Talha, and Zubayr ibn al-Awwam mobilized in Basra, Ali sent Malik to Kufa to rally reinforcements. Despite the neutral stance of the governor, Abu Musa al-Ash'ari, Malik successfully seized the governor's palace and delivered a series of speeches that persuaded over 9,000 Kufans to join Ali's army.

During the Battle of the Camel, Malik commanded the right wing of Ali's forces. He was a dominant figure on the battlefield, killing the Basran commander Hilal ibn Waki' and the prominent Umayyad leader Abd al-Rahman ibn Attab. In one of the most famous engagements of the battle, Malik grappled in single combat with Abd Allah ibn al-Zubayr. Malik struck Ibn al-Zubayr on the head and left him for dead on the field, though Ibn al-Zubayr was later rescued and survived his wounds. To end the bloodshed, Malik followed Ali's orders to disable Aisha’s camel, which served as the rallying point for the opposition, effectively ending the conflict.

=== The Battle of Siffin ===
At the Battle of Siffin (657 CE), Malik was established as the "real hero" and the "battering ram of Iraq" (minjanīq al-ʿIrāq). Early in the confrontation, he challenged the Syrian commander Abu al-A'war to single combat, though the latter refused. According to Hugh Kennedy, Malik was a vital source of inspiration, at one point personally intervening to prevent his troops from fleeing in panic during a Syrian charge.

When Ali and his supporters reached Siffin, Mu'awiya's forces had already occupied the Euphrates' watering place, preventing Ali's army from accessing the river. Mu'awiya initially refused to allow them access to the water, prompting Ali to send Malik al-Ashtar with the cavalry and al-Ash'ath ibn Qays with the infantry to seize it. The fighting continued until Ali's forces reached the Euphrates and drove off the defenders, whose commander was Abu al-A'war. Abd Allah ibn al-Harith, the brother of Malik al-Ashtar, was among those guarding the watering place.

The climax of the battle occurred during the "Night of Clangour" (Laylat al-Harir). While the Yemenite wings of the Kufan army wavered under heavy Syrian pressure, Malik rallied the troops and launched a counter-offensive that pushed Mu'awiya’s forces back to the edge of their camp. As Malik prepared for a final assault to capture Mu'awiya’s tent and end the war, the Syrian army fastened copies of the Quran to their lances to call for arbitration. Despite Malik’s insistence that victory was imminent, Ali was forced by his own soldiers to order a ceasefire.

When the time came to select a representative for the arbitration, Ali proposed Malik al-Ashtar or Abd Allah ibn Abbas. However, the leader of the Kufan tribesmen, Al-Ash'ath ibn Qays, and the radical qurra rejected Malik, fearing his military hawkishness would prevent a peaceful settlement.

== Appointment to Egypt and assassination ==
In 658 CE (38 AH), Ali appointed Malik al-Ashtar as the governor of Egypt to stabilize the province and support Muhammad ibn Abi Bakr, who was struggling against a Syrian invasion led by Amr ibn al-As. Malik was considered the only commander capable of securing the region, and his appointment caused significant alarm for Mu'awiya, who reportedly remarked that "Ali has two arms; one was severed at Siffin (meaning Ammar ibn Yasir) and the other is being severed now."

To prevent Malik from reaching his post, Mu’awiya bribed a local official identified as a tax collector or a village chief—in the Red Sea coastal town of al-Qulzum. Malik traveled from the Hijaz toward Egypt, deliberately avoiding Syrian-controlled territory to ensure his safety. However, upon stopping at al-Qulzum, he was received with feigned hospitality by the bribed official and was offered a lethal dose of poison, often described as being mixed into a drink of honey. Malik died shortly after consuming the mixture before he could assume his governorship. News of his death was met with public celebration in Damascus, as his removal effectively paved the way for the Umayyad conquest of Egypt and deprived Ali of his most formidable military strategist.

== Descendants ==
Malik al-Ashtar is known to have had at least one son, Ibrahim ibn al-Ashtar, who emerged as a prominent military commander during the Second Fitna. Ibrahim initially allied himself with Mukhtar al-Thaqafi and participated in campaigns against individuals implicated in the killing of Husayn ibn Ali, most notably defeating and killing Ubayd Allah ibn Ziyad at the Battle of Khazir in 686 CE.

Following Mukhtar’s defeat after the Battles of Madhar and Harura, Ibrahim transferred his allegiance to Abd Allah ibn al-Zubayr, under whose authority he continued to serve as a military commander. Ibrahim was killed in 691 CE at the Battle of Maskin while fighting Umayyad forces.

== Sources ==
- Hawting, G. R., ed. (1996). The History of al-Ṭabarī, Volume XVII: The First Civil War: From the Battle of Siffīn to the Death of ʿAlī, A.D. 656–661/A.H. 36–40. SUNY Series in Near Eastern Studies. Albany, New York: State University of New York Press. ISBN 978-0-7914-2393-6.
- Humphreys, R. Stephen, ed. (1990). The History of al-Ṭabarī, Volume XV: The Crisis of the Early Caliphate: The Reign of ʿUthmān, A.D. 644–656/A.H. 24–35. SUNY Series in Near Eastern Studies. Albany, New York: State University of New York Press. ISBN 978-0-7914-0154-5.
- Blankinship, Khalid Yahya, ed. (1993). The History of al-Ṭabarī, Volume XI: The Challenge to the Empires. SUNY Series in Near Eastern Studies. Albany, New York: State University of New York Press. ISBN 978-0-7914-0851-3.
- Fishbein, Michael, ed. (1990). The History of al-Ṭabarī, Volume XXI: The Victory of the Marwānids, A.D. 685–693/A.H. 66–73. SUNY Series in Near Eastern Studies. Albany, New York: State University of New York Press. ISBN 978-0-7914-0221-4.
- Wellhausen, Julius (1927). The Arab Kingdom and Its Fall. Translated by Margaret Graham Weir. Calcutta: University of Calcutta.
- Ibn Sa'd, Muhammad (2012). Kitab at-Tabaqat al-Kabir, Volume VI: The Scholars of Kufa. Translated by Aisha Bewley. London: Ta-Ha Publishers. ISBN 9781842001240.
- Kennedy, Hugh (2013). The Armies of the Caliphs: Military and Society in the Early Islamic State. Routledge. ISBN 9781134531134.
- Kennedy, Hugh (2004). The Prophet and the Age of the Caliphates: The Islamic Near East from the Sixth to the Eleventh Century. Routledge. ISBN 9780582405257.
- Madelung, W. (1997). The Succession to Muḥammad: A Study of the Early Caliphate. Cambridge University Press. ISBN 978-0-521-64696-3.
- Ibrahim, Mahmood (2011). Merchant Capital and Islam. University of Texas Press. ISBN 978-0-292-74118-8.
- Abdullah, Thabit (2014). A Short History of Iraq. Routledge. ISBN 978-1-317-86419-6.
- Abbas, Hassan (2021). The Prophet's Heir: The Life of Ali ibn Abi Talib. Yale University Press. ISBN 978-0-300-22945-5.
- Donner, Fred (2014). The Early Islamic Conquests. Princeton Studies on the Near East. Princeton University Press. ISBN 978-1-4008-4787-7.
- Veccia Vaglieri, L. (1960). "al-As̲h̲tar". In Gibb, H. A. R.; Kramers, J. H.; Lévi-Provençal, E.; Schacht, J.; Lewis, B. & Pellat, Ch. (eds.). The Encyclopaedia of Islam, Second Edition. Volume I: A–B. Leiden: E. J. Brill. pp. 704–709. OCLC 495469456.
- Koch, Bettina (2015). Patterns Legitimizing Political Violence in Transcultural Perspectives: Islamic and Christian Traditions and Legacies. Walter de Gruyter. ISBN 978-1-61451-394-0.
- Donner, Fred (2012). Muhammad and the Believers: At the Origins of Islam (illustrated, reprint ed.). Harvard University Press. ISBN 978-0-674-06414-0.
- Gordon, Matthew S.; Robinson, Chase F.; Rowson, Everett K.; Fishbein, Michael, eds. (2018). The Works of Ibn Wāḍiḥ al-Yaʿqūbī: An English Translation. Vol. 3. Brill. ISBN 978-90-04-36416-5.
