= Battle of Siffin =

657 battle of the First Fitna

Coordinates: 35.9500°N 39.0167°E

Battle of Siffin معركة صفين
- Part of the First Fitna
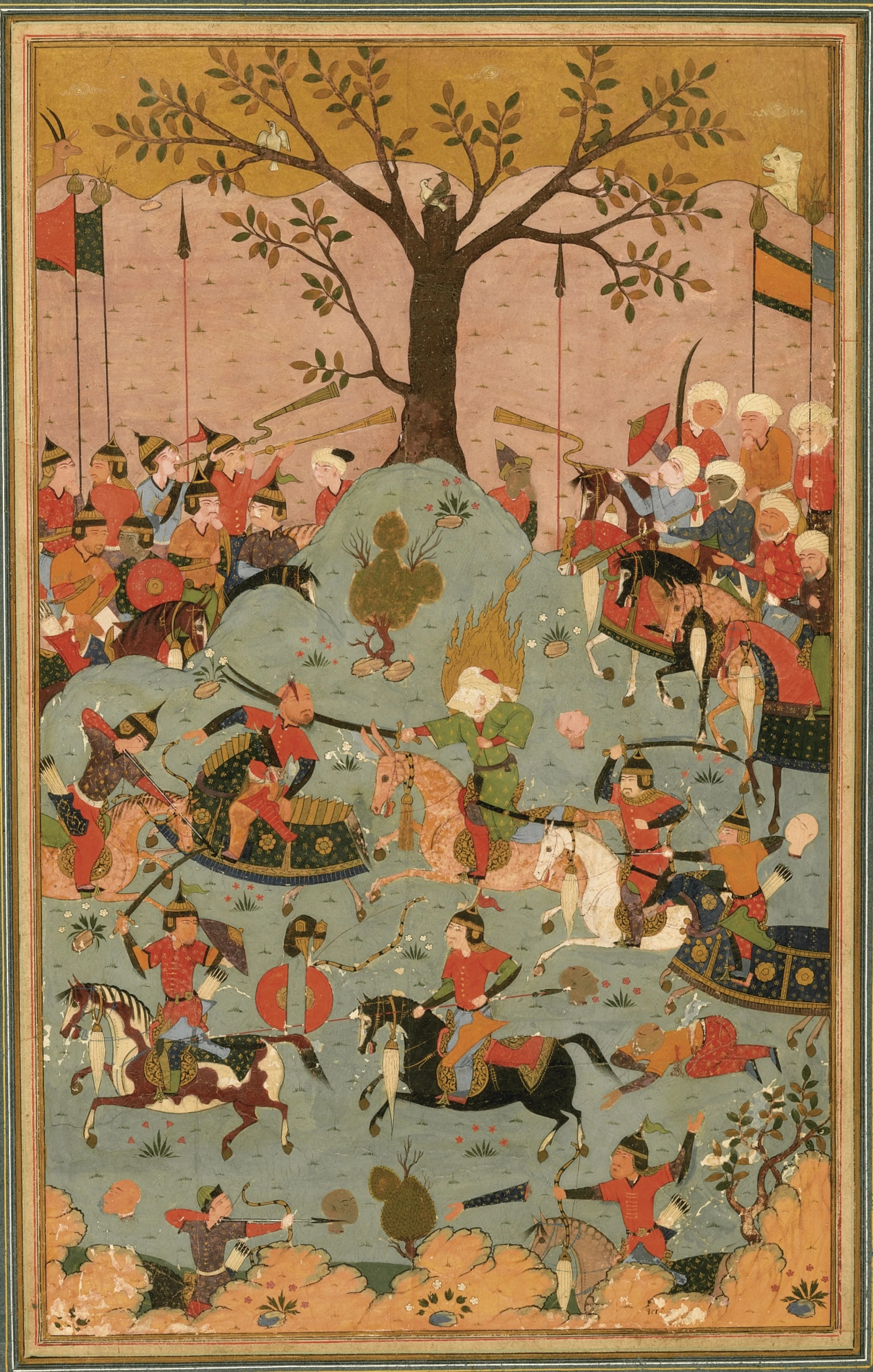
- Persian miniature, likely depicting Ali at the Battle of Siffin, created in Safavid Iran, dated 1516
Date	July 26 to July 28, 657 CE (8 Safar to 10 Safar, 37 AH)
Location	Siffin (Tell Abu Hureyra, near modern-day Raqqa, Syria)
Result	Inconclusive (See Arbitration)

Belligerents
Rashidun Caliphate	Umayyad Syria

Commanders and leaders
Ali ibn Abi Talib; Hasan ibn Ali; Husayn ibn Ali; Malik al-Ashtar; Al-Ash'ath ibn Qays; Ammar ibn Yasir †; Abd Allah ibn Budayl †; Hashim ibn Utba †	Mu'awiya ibn Abi Sufyan; Amr ibn al-As; Abd al-Rahman ibn Khalid; Habib ibn Maslama; Abu al-A'war; Al-Dahhak ibn Qays; Zufar ibn al-Harith; Busr ibn Abi Artat

Strength
100,000–150,000 men	130,000–150,000 men

Casualties and losses
25,000 killed	45,000 killed

The Battle of Siffin (Arabic: معركة صفّين, romanized: Maʿraka Ṣiffīn) was fought in 657 CE (37 AH) between the forces of the fourth Rashidun caliph, Ali ibn Abi Talib, and the forces of the Umayyad governor of Syria, Mu'awiya ibn Abi Sufyan. The battle is named after its location Siffin on the banks of the Euphrates river. The fighting stopped after Mu'awiya's Syrian army called for arbitration when Ali's Iraqi army started to gain the upper hand, to which Ali reluctantly agreed under pressure from the majority of his troops. The arbitration process ended inconclusively in 658 though it strengthened the Syrians' support for Mu'awiya and his political position while weakening the authority of Ali and causing dissension among the Iraqis. The battle was part of the First Fitna and is considered a major step towards the establishment of the Umayyad Caliphate.

== Location ==
The battlefield was located in Siffin, a ruined Byzantine-era village at the right bank of the Euphrates in the vicinity of Raqqa in present-day Syria. It has been identified with the village of Tell Abu Hureyra in Raqqa Governorate.

== Background ==
=== Opposition to Uthman ===
Ali frequently accused the third Rashidun caliph Uthman of deviating from the Quran and the Sunnah, and was joined in his criticism by many senior companions of the Islamic prophet Muhammad, including Talha and Zubayr. Uthman was also widely accused of nepotism, corruption, and injustice, and Ali is known to have protested his conduct, including his lavish gifts for his Umayyad kinsmen. Ali also protected outspoken companions, such as Abu Dharr al-Ghifari and Ammar ibn Yasir, from Uthman. Ali appears in early sources as a restraining influence on Uthman without directly opposing him. Some supporters of Ali were also part of the opposition to Uthman, joined in their efforts by Talha and Zubayr, as well as Aisha, a widow of Muhammad. Aisha was critical of Uthman for religious innovations and nepotism, while also objecting his reduction of her pension.

Among the supporters of Ali were Malik al-Ashtar (d. 657) and other religiously-learned qurra (lit. 'Quran readers'). These wanted to see Ali as the next caliph, though there is no evidence that he communicated or coordinated with them. Ali is also said to have rejected the requests to lead the rebels, although he might have sympathized with their grievances, and was thus considered a natural focus for the opposition, at least morally. It is also likely that some companions supported the protests with the hope of either deposing Uthman, or changing his policies, thus underestimating the severity of the opposition to the caliph.

=== Assassination of Uthman ===
As their grievances mounted, discontented groups from provinces began arriving in Medina in 35/656. On their first attempt, the Egyptian opposition sought the advice of Ali, who urged them to send a delegation to negotiate with Uthman, unlike Talha and Ammar, who might have encouraged the Egyptians to advance on the town. Ali similarly asked the Iraqi opposition to avoid violence, which was heeded. He also acted as a mediator between Uthman and the provincial dissidents more than once to address their economic and political grievances. In particular, he negotiated and guaranteed on behalf of Uthman the promises that persuaded the rebels to return home and ended the first siege. Ali then urged Uthman to publicly repent, which he did. The caliph soon retracted his statement, however, possibly because his secretary Marwan convinced him that repentance would only embolden the opposition.

On their way back home, some Egyptian rebels intercepted an official letter ordering their punishment. They now returned to Medina and laid siege to Uthman's residence for a second time, demanding that he abdicate. The caliph refused and claimed he was unaware of the letter, for which Marwan is often blamed in the early sources. Ali and another companion, Muhammad ibn Maslama, sided with Uthman about the letter, and suspected Marwan, while a report by the Sunni historian al-Baladhuri (d. 892) suggests that the caliph accused Ali of forging the letter. This is likely when Ali refused to further intercede for Uthman. That Ali was behind the letter is also the opinion of the Islamicist Leone Caetani (d. 1935). Among other Western historians, Giorgio Levi della Vida (d. 1967) is unsure, while Wilferd Madelung strongly rejects the accusation, saying that it "stretches the imagination" in the absence of any evidence. In turn, he accuses Marwan, the bellicose secretary of Uthman, while Hugh N. Kennedy holds Uthman responsible for the letter. The caliph was assassinated soon afterward in the final days of 35 AH (June 656) by the Egyptian rebels, during a raid on his residence in Medina.

=== Role of Ali in the assassination ===
Ali played no role in the deadly attack, and his son Hasan was injured while guarding the besieged residence of Uthman at the request of Ali. He also convinced the rebels not to prevent the delivery of water to Uthman's house during the siege. Beyond this, historians disagree about his measures to protect the third caliph. Ali is represented by the Sunni historian al-Tabari (d. 923) as an honest negotiator genuinely concerned for Uthman. Madelung and the modern historian Husain M. Jafri (d. 2019) highlight the attempts by Ali for reconciliation, and the Islamicist Martin Hinds (d. 1988) believes that Ali could not have done anything more for Uthman. The Islamic author Reza Shah-Kazemi points to Ali's "constructive criticism" of Uthman and his opposition to violence, while the Bahai scholar Moojan Momen writes that Ali mediated between Uthman and the rebels, urging the former to alter his policies and refusing the requests from the latter to lead them. This is similar to the view of the Islamicist John McHugo, who adds that Ali withdrew in frustration when his peace efforts were thwarted by Marwan.

The historians Fred Donner and Robert Gleave suggest that Ali was the immediate beneficiary of Uthman's death. In turn, Madelung argues that Aisha would have not actively opposed Uthman if Ali had been the prime mover of the rebellion. He and others observe the hostility of Aisha toward Ali, which resurfaced immediately after his accession. The orientalist Laura Veccia Vaglieri (d. 1989) believes that Ali refused to lead the rebellion but still sympathized with them and possibly agreed with their calls for Uthman's abdication. Among other scholars, Hossein Nasr and Asma Afsaruddin, Levi della Vida, and Julius Wellhausen (d. 1918) believe that Ali remained neutral in this conflict, while Caetani labels Ali as the chief culprit in the murder of Uthman, even though the evidence suggests otherwise. The Muslim scholar Mahmoud M. Ayoub (d. 2021) notes the often pro-Umayyad stance of the Western classical orientalists, with the exception of Madelung.

=== Election of Ali ===
When Uthman was killed in 656 CE by the Egyptian rebels, the potential candidates for the caliphate were Ali and Talha. The Umayyads had fled Medina, and the provincial rebels and the Ansar (early Medinan Muslims) were in control of the city. Among the Egyptians, Talha enjoyed some support, but the Basrans and Kufans, who had heeded Ali's call for nonviolence, and most of the Ansar supported Ali. Some authors add the Muhajirun (early Meccan Muslims) to this list of Ali's supporters. The key tribal chiefs also seem to have favored Ali at the time.

The caliphate was thus offered by these groups to Ali, who was initially reluctant to accept it, saying that he preferred to be a minister (wazir). Soon after, possibly after it became clear that he enjoyed popular support, Ali did accept the caliphate, demanding a public pledge at the mosque. One factor in his decision to accept the caliphate might have been to prevent further chaos, but his nomination by the rebels nevertheless left Ali exposed to accusations of complicity in the assassination of Uthman. It also appears that Ali personally did not force anyone for pledge and, among others, Sa'd ibn Abi Waqqas, Abd Allah ibn Umar, Sa'id ibn al-As, al-Walid ibn Uqba, and Marwan likely refused to give their oaths, some possibly motivated by their personal grudges against Ali. On the whole, Madelung suggests that there is less evidence for any violence here than in the case of the first caliph, Abu Bakr (r. 632–634), even though many broke with Ali later, claiming that they had pledged under duress. At the same time, that the rebels favored Ali might have created an intimidating atmosphere in Medina for those opposed to him.

=== Uthman's governors ===
At the time of the assassination, key governorships were in the hands of the Umayyads, and their often-late conversion to Islam might have suggested expediency to Ali and the Ansar. Ali was nevertheless advised to initially confirm the governors of Uthman, some of whom were unpopular, to consolidate his authority over the caliphate. He rejected this advice and replaced nearly all those who had served Uthman, saying that the likes of those men should not be appointed to any office. In this and other decisions, Ali was driven by his sense of religious mission, writes Madelung, while Poonawala suggests that Ali changed the governors to please the rebels. Donner has a similar view to Madelung and Shah-Kazemi maintains that justice was the key principle that molded Ali's policies in all domains.

Even so, Madelung views this decision of Ali as politically naive. In turn, the Shia scholar Ali Bahramian believes that replacing the governors was the only available course of action, both on principle and in practice. He contends that injustice was the main grievance of the provincial rebels and they would have turned against Ali had he confirmed Uthman's governors. Among these governors was Uthman's cousin Mu'awiya, who had been appointed as a local governor in Syria by the second caliph Umar (r. 634–644), and then risen to become the sole governor over the entirety of Syria under Uthman. Having ruled in Syria for almost twenty years, without interruption and almost since its conquest, Mu'awiya was firmly entrenched in Syria with a strong power base which made his removal difficult. Ali replaced Mu'awiya with his cousin Abd Allah ibn Abbas, who feared the retaliation of Mu'awiya and asked Ali to postpone his appointment until his rule was firmly established, according to al-Baladhuri.

== Mu'awiya's revolt ==
=== Removal of Mu'awiya ===
There are some reports of early correspondence, and al-Baladhuri writes about a letter from Ali that asked Mu'awiya to report to him in Medina. Alternatively, Madelung suggests that Ali contacted Mu'awiya only after arriving in Kufa. Ali's first emissary was Jarir ibn Abd Allah al-Bajali, a notable Yemenite and Uthman's governor of Hamadan, who volunteered to represent Ali because of his personal ties with the Umayyads. He was nevertheless deemed unfit for the task by some, including Malik al-Ashtar, who questioned his loyalty. Jarir carried with him a letter to Mu'awiya that demanded his pledge of allegiance to Ali and made it clear that he would be dismissed from his post afterward.

The caliph argued in his letter that his election in Medina was binding on Mu'awiya in Syria because he was elected by the same people who had pledged to his predecessors, as reported in Waq'at Siffin, authored by the Shia Nasr ibn Muzahim (d. 828), one of the earliest historians of the civil war. The letter added that the election of the caliph was the right of the Muhajiran and the Ansar, thus explicitly excluding Mu'awiya, as a late convert (taliq), from any shura, and from the caliphate itself. The letter also urged Mu'awiya to leave justice for Uthman to Ali, promising that he would deal with the issue in due course. By this time, Mu'awiya had already publicly charged Ali with complicity in the death of Uthman.

Having failed to intimidate Ali's governor of Egypt, Qays ibn Sa'd, to switch sides, Mu'awiya forged a letter from him to himself in which the latter supported the former's right for retaliation, according to Madelung. In response to Ali's letter, Mu'awiya asked Jarir for time, then addressed the congregation at the next prayer, appealed to their patriotism, and received their pledge as amir to avenge Uthman, as detailed by Ibn Muzahim and the Shia historian Ibn A'tham al-Kufi (ninth century). He soon launched a propaganda campaign across Syria, charging Ali with being complicit in the death of Uthman and calling for retribution.

=== Alliance against Ali ===
Mu'awiya also wrote to Amr ibn al-As to join him in Damascus, and draw on his political and military expertise. A Qurayshite companion of Muhammad and a military strategist, Amr had conquered, and then governed Egypt, but was later removed by Uthman. After his dismissal, Amr incited rebellion against Uthman, and is later reported to have taken credit for the assassination of Uthman by the Egyptian rebels. However, he soon changed his tone and pinned the murder on Ali, possibly fearing the Umayyads' wrath, or perhaps realizing that he would not receive a post in Ali's government. After arriving in Damascus, Amr officially swore allegiance to Mu'awiya in 657. He thus pledged to back the Umayyads against Ali in return for the life-long governorship of Egypt. This pact turned a suspect in the assassination of Uthman into his avenger, and also later gave rise to a story recorded by some historians, including al-Baladhuri and the Shia-leaning al-Ya'qubi (d. 897-8), where Amr privately confesses in this story to selling his religion for worldly gain. Even though the story itself is apocryphal, Ayoub suggests that it may portray the popular perception of the conflict between Ali and Mu'awiya, which the story presents as a conflict between "the people of religion" and "the people of this world," respectively. The Mu'tazilite Ibn Abi'l-Hadid (d. 1258) gives Amr the credit for successfully spreading the rumor that Ali was involved in Uthman's murder.

Mu'awiya also brought into his camp the influential Syrian Shurahbil ibn Simt, whom he convinced that Ali was complicit in the death of Uthman. After some hesitation, Shurahbil became an enthusiastic advocate for Mu'awiya. Mu'awiya also reached out to the religious elite in Mecca and Medina, asking them to hold Ali accountable for sheltering the murderers of Uthman and proposing that the next caliph should be elected by a council, emphasizing that he was not interested in the caliphate himself. According to Ayoub, the Medinans rejected his request and accused him of deception and treachery, citing al-Kufi. Madelung similarly writes that al-Miswar ibn Makhrama refused to support Mu'awiya. Mu'awiya also separately wrote to Abd Allah ibn Umar and Sa'd ibn Abi Waqqas among the Muhajirun, and Muhammad ibn Maslama among the Ansar. They all vowed neutrality in response, with the last one accusing Mu'awiya of abandoning Uthman in his life and taking advantage of his death.

=== Proposed secession of Syria and Egypt ===
Mu'awiya soon privately visited Ali's emissary, Jarir, and proposed to recognize Ali as the caliph in return for the governorship of Syria, and according to some sources, the annexation of Egypt, as well as their revenues. The major historical accounts are unaware of this proposal, writes Madelung, which is nevertheless mentioned in a poem by al-Walid ibn Uqba, who was close to Mu'awiya. The latter may have kept this proposal secret because it contradicted the public statements that his goal was to avenge Uthman. Jarir conveyed this proposal to Ali in a letter, who rejected it, possibly perceiving the proposal as a stratagem for Mu'awiya to take over the caliphate step by step. Alternatively, had Ali accepted Mu'awiya's proposal, the Islamic territory might have been irreversibly divided into two parts, suggests McHugo.

=== Declaration of war by Mu'awiya ===
Mu'awiya now sent Jarir back to Kufa with a formal declaration of war, which charged Ali with the murder of Uthman and vowed that the Syrians would fight Ali until he surrendered Uthman's murderers. Then there would be a new council (shura) in Syria to elect the next caliph, the declaration continued. Ali replied to this letter that he was innocent and that the accusations of Mu'awiya lacked any evidence. He also challenged Mu'awiya to name any Syrian who would qualify to vote in a shura. As for handing Uthman's killers to Mu'awiya, Ali asked the latter to pledge allegiance and then present his case before Ali's court. Ali viewed this as a rebellion against the legitimate Muslim caliph, that is, a challenge to God's authority.

=== Mu'awiya's motives ===
Modern authors often suggest that Mu'awiya defied Ali after he deposed him as the governor of Syria, or conditioned his pledge to Ali on revenge for Uthman, knowing that Ali would dismiss him after giving his oath. At the time, Mu'awiya was repeatedly accused of abandoning Uthman during the deadly siege of his residence, and Ayoub thus views Mu'awiya's claim of revenge as a pretext. Other modern authors similarly tend to consider Mu'awiya's call for revenge as a guise, intended initially to maintain his rule over Syria, or to seize the caliphate altogether later. For McHugo, this view is corroborated by Mu'awiya's secret offer to recognize the caliphate of Ali in return for Syria and Egypt. A notable exception is Kennedy, who believes that Mu'awiya was sincerely seeking justice for Uthman. Some authors instead regard the call for revenge as a pious cloak for broader issues: Hinds and Poonawala trace back Mu'awiya's revolt to his demands to rule over an autonomous Syria, which was kept free (unlike Iraq) from uncontrolled immigration to check the Byzantine threat. In contrast, after the Byzantines' defeats, Ali might have expected all provinces to equally share the burden of immigration. Shaban has a similar view. Verse 17:33 of the Quran was cited by Mu'awiya to justify revenge, "If anyone is killed wrongfully, We give his next-of-kin authority, but let him not be extravagant in killing, surely he is being helped," although Madelung suggests that the clause about a commensurate response was later ignored in the "frenzy of patriotic self-righteousness". Mu'awiya's other justification for revolting against Ali was that he had not participated in the election of Ali, or that the rebels were involved in the election.

Regarding the emphasis on a shura in Syria after deposing Ali, Mu'awiya's reported justification was that the people of the Hejaz had abandoned the truth since Uthman had been assassinated there and it was now the Syrians who had to uphold justice for him, as explained in a letter attributed to him shortly before the Battle of Siffin. However, this emphasis was likely to ensure that he would be named as caliph. Madelung comments here that Mu'awiya later designated his son Yazid as his successor without any shura. As for whether and when Mu'awiya first aspired to the caliphate, it is the conclusion of Ayoub that he might have had two scenarios in mind: The first one was keeping governorship over Syria and possibly annexing Egypt, as he indeed proposed to Ali's envoy, Jarir. Another clause of this same proposal was that Mu'awiya would not recognize the successor of Ali in case of his death, which suggests that Mu'awiya might have considered himself the future caliph after Ali. The second scenario was that Mu'awiya would succeed in removing Ali from office. This is evident in some speeches and letters attributed to Mu'awiya before the Battle of Siffin, in which his case for the caliphate and attaining it by force is defended. Gaining political power by force soon became the common practice for Muslim rulers and would be later legitimized by some Sunni jurists.

=== Ali and retribution for Uthman ===
Ali was openly critical of the conduct of Uthman, though he generally neither justified his violent death nor condemned his killers. While he did not condone the assassination, Ali probably held Uthman responsible through his injustice for the protests that led to his death, a view for which Poonawala cites Waq'at Siffin. From this same source, Ayoub cites the account of the negotiations before the engagement, in which Ali is quoted as saying that Uthman was killed by those indignant about his transgressions. Even when pressed by Mu'awiya's envoys, the report adds that Ali refused to say that Uthman was killed wrongfully. Still, in his letters to Mu'awiya and elsewhere, Ali insisted that he would bring the murderers to justice in due course, probably after establishing his authority. Quoting al-Ya'qubi and al-Kufi, Ayoub suggests that Uthman had been murdered by a mob from various tribes and that Ali could have not punished them without risking widespread tribal conflict, even if he could identify them.

Here, the Islamicists Farhad Daftary and John Kelsay say that the actual murderers soon fled Medina after the assassination, a view for which Jafri cites al-Tabari. Closely associated with Ali was Malik al-Ashtar, a leader of the qurra, who had led the Kufan delegation against Uthman, even though they had heeded Ali's call for nonviolence, and did not participate in the deadly siege. A leading Egyptian rebel with links to Ali was his stepson, Muhammad ibn Abi Bakr, who was reported to be among those who killed Uthman. Other authors have rejected this accusation, though most sources seem to agree that he visited Uthman shortly before his death and rebuked him for his conduct. These two men and some other supporters of Ali were implicated by Mu'awiya in the assassination of Uthman. In this light, some authors suggest that Ali was unwilling or unable to punish these individuals. In any case, the revenge for Uthman soon became the pretext for two revolts against Ali.

=== Role of Mu'awiya in the assassination ===
Other authors have instead implicated Mu'awiya or his close associates in the assassination of Uthman. Madelung writes that Amr ibn al-As, a close ally of Mu'awiya, was reported earlier to have taken credit for the assassination. At the time, Mu'awiya was also repeatedly accused of abandoning Uthman during the deadly siege of his residence, and this view is echoed by the author Hassan Abbas and by the Shia scholar Muhammad H. Tabatabai (d. 1981). Similarly, a letter ascribed by al-Tabari and al-Ya'qubi to Uthman during the siege alleges that Mu'awiya withheld the requested reinforcements to benefit politically from the caliph's death. It is also commonly believed that Marwan, the secretary of Uthman, was responsible for the intercepted instructions to punish the rebels that set off the final siege. Abbas and Hazleton further suggest that Marwan may have done so at the instigation of Mu'awiya. Tabatabai writes that during his rule as caliph, Mu'awiya no longer pursued vengeance for Uthman, which was the basis for his claim to the caliphate.

== War preparations ==
=== Iraq ===
In Iraq, Ali called a council of the Muhajirun and the Ansar who unanimously urged him to fight Mu'awiya after the latter declared war. Some apparently suggested that Ali remain in Kufa and send a force against Mu'awiya, but the caliph preferred to take the command himself. As for the public, the Kufans were not united in supporting the war, either simply because of its expected toll, or because they were reluctant to shed other Muslims' blood, particularly since the Syrians had never pledged allegiance to Ali in the first place. This last argument was also put forward to justify the rebellion in a letter directed at Ali and attributed to Mu'awiya. Elsewhere, Ali is said to have barred his followers from cursing the Syrians, saying that it might jeopardize any remaining hopes for a peaceful resolution. One such report is in connection with Hujr ibn Adi and Amr ibn al-Hamiq, both loyal to Ali. When the caliph learned that they were openly dissociating from and cursing the Syrians, he asked them to describe the evil in their actions instead of vilifying them. However, Ali introduced a curse on Mu'awiya and his close supporters in the qunuts of his fajr congregational prayers when the latter was declared caliph in Syria. A report by al-Tabari indicates that Ali directly negotiated with the Kufan tribal leaders and enlisted in his army some 40,000 muqatila (lit. 'fighting men'), 17,000 of their sons who had reached the fighting age, and 8,000 clients and slaves. In Basra, however, Ali's governor was only able to recruit some 3200 men.

=== Syria ===
In Syria, Uthman's bloodstained shirt was taken from town to town to incite the people to revenge, though the support for the war was also not unanimous there. Among others, Shurahbil ibn Simt rallied support against Ali across Syria, directly accusing the caliph of being complicit in Uthman's murder, according to Ibn Muzahim. To show the success of Mu'awiya's campaign against Ali, Bahramian cites a report by al-Tabari, according to which a Syrian soldier told his Iraqi counterpart that their prayers were invalid because they were led by Ali. Mu'awiya also secured the Byzantine borders by agreeing to a truce at the cost of a "humiliating" tribute to them. He left the protection of his western borders to three local Palestinian commanders, probably because Muhammad ibn Abu Bakr faced internal problems as Ali's new governor in Egypt.

=== Comparisons ===
Siffin is described in Arabic sources as a conflict between the people of Iraq and Syria, in which most tribes were represented on both sides, such as the Banu Kath'am, which was divided to Iraqi and Syrian branches. The number of troops is uncertain. According to Nasr ibn Muzahim (d. 828), both armies numbered around 150,000 by one report, whereas another report puts the numbers at 100,000 and 130,000 for Ali and Mu'awiya, respectively. As for their Islamic credentials, a considerable number of Muhammad's companions were present in Ali's army, whereas Mu'awiya could only boast a handful of companions. In Ayoub's view, the Syrian army was loyal to Mu'awiya, whereas Ali's troops were mostly semi-nomadic men unaccustomed to a central authority. In support, Ayoub cites a tradition attributed to al-Hajjaj ibn Khuzayma. He reportedly brought the news of the assassination to Mu'awiya, praised the loyalty of his army, and added that with Ali were men who often interrupted his speech and questioned his command.

As for the recruitments, the historian Michael Lecker considers Mu'awiya's "fierce and at times cynical" propaganda more successful than Ali's. The former also promised better material benefits to tribal leaders compared to Ali, who applied strict measures to governors who accumulated wealth, and this in turn led to their defection to Mu'awiya's side. Lecker thus considers Mu'awiya's hilm or well-considered opportunism to be more successful at Siffin than Ali's piety. Some Arabic sources further contrast Mu'awiya's hilm or opportunism with Ali's futuwwa (Islamic chivalry). Shia sources also describe Siffin as a confrontation of Muhammad's cousin and son-in-law with the son of Muhammad's arch-enemy, Abu Sufyan, who had led the confederate armies against Muslims in the Battle of the Trench. This attitude is also reflected in a report by the Sunni al-Tabari, in which a companion of Ali likens the battle against Mu'awiya to Muhammad's battle against the polytheists (mushrikun) or rather its continuation. In Iraq, it is the view of historian Bernard Lewis (d. 2018) that the position of Ali was weakened by tribal disunity and insubordination. To illustrate the division among the Kufans, Ayoub cites an account by Ibn Muzahim to the effect that some asked Ali for permission to accompany his army without engaging in battle until they made up their minds. In contrast, Syria was ruled by the Ghassanid kingdom before Islam, and the Syrian Arabs were thus accustomed to a central authority and obedient to Mu'awiya, according to Wellhausen.

== Skirmishes ==
After leaving Kufa, Ali's army took the route through al-Mada'in. They reached Siffin early in the summer of 36/657, a location west of the Euphrates. There, Mu'awiya's forces were already waiting for them, and prevented them from accessing the watering place. A messenger of Ali now told Mu'awiya that they did not wish to fight the Syrians without proper warning, to which Mu'awiya responded by fortifying the forces who were guarding the water. Their justification for depriving Iraqis of water was their claim that their enemies were the murderers of Uthman. This is indeed what al-Imama wa al-siyasa quotes from al-Walid ibn Uqba, an advisor to Mu'awiya. In the opinion of Madelung, however, Mu'awiya and the Syrians were perhaps carried away by their own propaganda against Ali. In a related account, al-Ya'qubi quotes Mu'awiya as saying, "May God not allow me and my father [Abu Sufyan] drink from the spring (hawd) of the messenger of God if they [the enemies] ever drink from this water."

Soon, however, the Iraqis drove off the Syrians and seized control of the watering place, though Ali permitted the enemies to freely access the water source. For Ayoub, this episode is an example of how Mu'awiya used religious language for military and political gain, while Ali held religious imperatives above all. The two sides at Siffin engaged in skirmishes and negotiations. This continued for some three months, certainly through the month of Muharram, in which fighting is prohibited in Islam. The long idle period reflects the troops' reluctance for battle, possibly because they were averse to shedding other Muslims' blood, or because most tribes were represented on both sides. Donner believes that neither of the two leaders enjoyed strong support among their armies. At any rate, the negotiations failed, possibly on 18 July 657, and the two sides prepared for battle. Per Arab customs, prominent figures in both armies fought with small retinues prior to the main battle, which took place a week later.

== Main battle ==
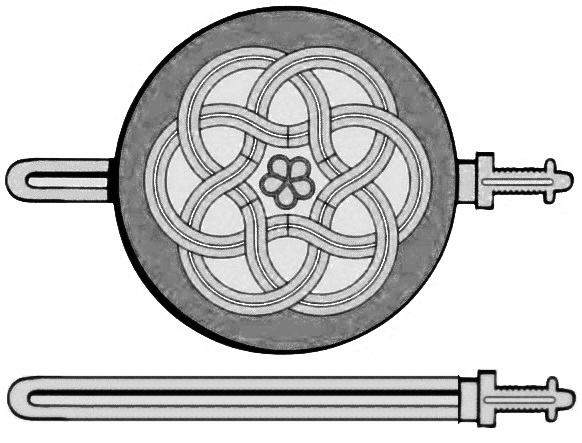
Zulfiqar with and without the shield. The Fatimid depiction of Ali's sword as carved on the Gates of Old Cairo, namely Bab al-Nasr.

Historical materials are abundant about the Battle of Siffin but they often describe disconnected episodes of the war. Lecker and Wellhausen have thus found it impossible to establish the course of the battle. Nevertheless, it can be said with some certainty that the battle began on Wednesday, 26 July 657, and continued to Friday or Saturday morning. Ali probably refrained from initiating hostilities, according to al-Tabari, and fought with his men on the frontline when the main battle broke out, whereas Mu'awiya led from his pavilion. At the end of the first day, having pushed back Ali's right-wing, Mu'awiya had fared better overall. Amr ibn al-As was one of the commanders of the Syrian army. Their advance guard was led by Abu al-A'war al-Sulami, who is credited with depriving Ali's troops from drinking water prior to battle. On the other side, Kennedy suggests that Malik al-Ashtar was an inspiration on the battlefield to many of the Iraqis, at one point saving his men from fleeing in panic. Early on, he is said to have challenged Abu al-A'war to single combat, but the latter refused.

On the second day, Mu'awiya concentrated his assault on Ali's left wing but his forces were pushed back by the Iraqis. Mu'awiya was compelled to retreat from his pavilion and take shelter in an army tent. Ubayd Allah ibn Umar and Samayfa ibn Nakur, commanders of Mu'awiya's elite battalions, were killed in the combat. On the other side, Ammar ibn Yasir, an octogenarian companion of Muhammad, was killed fighting for Ali. In the canonical Sunni sources Sahih al-Bukhari and Sahih Muslim, a prophetic hadith (lit. 'saying') predicts Ammar's death at the hands of al-fi'a al-baghiya (lit. 'rebellious aggressive group') who invite to hellfire. On the third day, Mu'awiya turned down the proposal to settle the matters in a personal duel with Ali. Urwa ibn Dawud al-Dimashqi volunteered to fight instead of Mu'awiya and was promptly "cleft in two" by Ali. After another indecisive day, the battle continued throughout laylat al-harir (lit. 'the night of rumble'). Unlike Ali, Mu'awiya did not allow the enemy to recover and bury their dead when he advanced. It was perhaps around this time that Mu'awiya repeated his earlier offer for peace in return for the rule of Syria, according to Ibn Muzahim. His account adds that Ali rejected the offer again, saying that he would not abandon jihad against the enemies of God, even if he were to be killed in His way seventy times and revived each time. According to the same source, it was around the same time that Mu'awiya sent his brother Utba to negotiate a separate truce with al-Ash'ath ibn Qays, the influential Yemenite tribal leader, who was not closely associated with Ali or his cause.

== Call to arbitration ==
By the next morning, the balance had begun to move in favor of Ali and the Iraqis, as suggested by al-Tabari and al-Baladhuri. Before noon, however, some of the Syrians raised pages of the Quran on their lances, shouting, "Let the Book of God be the judge between us." The fighting thus stopped at once. Bahramian lists two precedents for this: before and during the Battle of the Camel, a representative of Ali, carrying a copy of the Quran, had summoned the rebels to the book. Later, Ka'b ibn Sur al-Azdi, the judge (qadi) of Basra, who counted among the rebels, walked to the battlefield with a copy of the Quran and pleaded for the fighting to stop. By this point at Siffin, Ali is estimated to have lost 25,000 men, while Mu'awiya might have lost 45,000 men. It was consistently Mu'awiya's position that battle was the only option acceptable to the Syrians. The Syrians' call for arbitration thus indicates that Mu'awiya had sensed the potential of defeat, argue Madelung and McHugo. This tends to be the view of many other modern authors, some of whom add that Mu'awiya was advised to do so by Amr ibn al-As, citing al-Tabari and al-Baladhuri, among others.

=== Iraqis' reaction ===
The Syrians' call to arbitration on the basis of the Quran has thus been interpreted as an offer to surrender. Even so, Ali's army stopped fighting, perhaps because as devout Muslims they had been fighting to enforce the rule of the Quran all along, or simply because both armies were exhausted and a truce must have appealed to them, or because some in his camp saw the ceasefire as an opportunity to regain their influence over Ali. While this majority wanted the fighting to stop, there was also probably a minority that was certain of victory and wanted the fight to continue, and yet another minority that followed Ali unconditionally. For his part, Ali is said to have exhorted his men to continue fighting, telling them to no avail that raising the Quran was for deception. The account of Ibn Muzahim too reflects this attitude of Ali.

Despite his pleas, the majority of the qurra and those reluctant for war insisted on accepting the call to arbitration. In the former group, Mis'ar ibn Fadaki al-Tamimi and Zayd ibn Hisn al-Ta'i, who both later became Kharijite leaders, threatened to kill Ali if he did not answer the Syrians' call. The latter group included the ridda tribesmen of Kufa and all newcomers to the city from their clans. These formed the largest bloc in Ali's army. They followed al-Ash'ath ibn Qays, who told Ali that his clan would not fight for him if he refused the Syrians' call, as reported in Waq'at Siffin and Moruj. Ali might have thus faced a mutiny, and was forced to recall al-Ashtar, who is said to have advanced far towards the Syrian camp, reportedly separated from victory by "a horse's gallop." He initially refused to stop fighting, perhaps sensing to be on the verge of victory. Contrary to all these reports, an account by al-Kufi suggests that Ali welcomed the call to arbitration, even comparing it to the Treaty of Hudaybiyya (628) by Muhammad. This account is what John Kelsay and Reza Aslan prefer, with the latter saying that most of his men pleaded with Ali to ignore the call to arbitration but he accepted it and cited the Quranic verse 2:193, "if [the enemy] desists, then you must also cease hostilities." Fred Donner writes that Ali only reluctantly accepted arbitration. Modern authors tend to view Ali as opposed to the arbitration, including Madelung, McHugo, Poonawala, and Ayoub.

=== Iraqis' motives ===
As for the motives of al-Ash'ath, Ali had confirmed him in his post as the governor of Azerbaijan under Uthman, but also warned him in a letter about embezzling public funds. The governor might have done so during his tenure under Uthman, and thus perhaps contemplated joining Mu'awiya in rebellion but was dissuaded from doing so. Ali later supported Hujr ibn Adi, a rival of al-Ash'ath within the Kinda tribe, and then removed the latter from his military post just before leaving Iraq, replacing him with Hasan ibn Makhduj. The last two belonged to different Yemenite tribes and the appointment thus rekindled old tribal rivalries, according to Ayoub. While al-Ash'ath is also known to have expressed concern over the insecurity of Iran and the Byzantines' threat during the civil war, Kennedy suggests that he also preferred a weakened Ali.

Jafri similarly writes that al-Ash'ath and other Kufan tribal leaders would have benefited from a deadlock between Ali and Mu'awiya: On the one hand, they would have lost their tribal power under a victorious Ali, who likely intended to restore the Islamic leadership in Kufa at the cost of its tribal aristocracy that had emerged under Uthman. On the other hand, Mu'awiya's victory would have meant the subjugation and loss of Iraq as the base of their power. Therefore, they reluctantly participated in Siffin and readily accepted the arbitration offers. The opinion of Hinds is close, while Shaban similarly writes that the Kufan tribes had benefited from Uthman's policies and were not enthusiastic about the war with Mu'awiya. Jafri further suggests that the Kufan tribal leaders probably resented the egalitarian policies of Ali, as he divided the treasury funds equally among Arabs and non-Arabs, and among late-comers and new-comers to Kufa. This is also the view of Ayoub.

There are different views as to why the qurra preferred arbitration. Perhaps they welcomed arbitration by the Quran because they had been fighting to enforce the rule of the Quran all along. Alternatively, Kennedy suggests that the qurra may have wanted a compromise with the Syrians that would have restricted the caliph. His argument is that the Iraqi qurra had opposed Uthman to gain more financial and political autonomy. They were thus willing to grant the same autonomy to the Syrians. In contrast, Jafri first argues that the term qurra in early sources loosely refers to two groups: The first group was the Kufan qurra who revolted against Uthman and loyally supported Ali, led by the likes of Malik al-Ashtar and Hujr ibn Adi. The second group was the Basran qurra and other tribesmen who conveniently advanced their claims under the cloak of Islamic priority. It was this second group that backed the arbitration proposal, following the tribal leaders, who then nominated as their representative Abu Musa al-Ash'ari with a known preference for Qurayshite domination. It was at this point that the disillusioned second group rejected the arbitration and formed the Kharijites. That the Kharijites consisted primarily of Basran tribesmen is also the view of the modern Islamicist Maria Dakake.

=== Arbitration agreement ===
Mu'awiya then conveyed his proposal that representatives from both sides should together reach a binding solution on the basis of the Quran. He was silent at this point about revenge for Uthman and removal of Ali from office. Ibn Muzahim names Abu al-A'war al-Sulami as Mu'awiya's envoy to Ali. The proposal of Mu'awiya was accepted by the majority of Ali's army, reports al-Tabari. Nevertheless, the opposition to arbitration was a sizeable minority in Ali's camp, consisting of those who now realized the political motives of Mu'awiya. This minority wanted Ali to resume fighting, and their proposal was likely favored by Ali too. He declined it, however, saying that they would be crushed by the majority and the Syrians who all demanded arbitration. Some of these dissidents left for Kufa, while others stayed, perhaps hoping that Ali might later change his mind.

Facing strong peace sentiments in his army, Ali thus accepted the arbitration proposal, most likely against his own judgment. Here, Madelung criticizes Ali for this decision and suggests that he acted more like a tribal chief than the caliph. Later Ali defended his decision in Kufa, saying that he considered continuing the fight, alongside that minority, but feared that Hasan and Husayn would perish and with them the lineage of Muhammad. It is also possible that he expected the arbitration to collapse but reluctantly went along with it to exhaust this option which was favored by the majority in his camp who apparently hoped for an honorable settlement with Mu'awiya. In any case, the arbitration agreement divided the camp of Ali, as many there could not accept that he would negotiate with Mu'awiya, whose claims they considered fraudulent. It also handed Mu'awiya a moral victory as an equal contender for the caliphate.

==== Selection of the arbitrators ====
In Ali's camp, Abu Musa al-Ashari was proposed as the representative by al-Ash'ath and the Iraqi qurra, who were led by Zayd ibn Hisn al-Ta'i and Mis'ar ibn Fadaki al-Tamimi. Abu Musa was the former governor of Kufa, installed by the Iraqi rebels and later confirmed by Ali, who was dissuaded from removing him by al-Ashtar. He was soon dismissed after opposing the war preparations for the Battle of the Camel. The majority in Ali's army also pressed for Abu Musa, even though he was reportedly neutral, and despite the opposition of Ali, who said he could not trust Abu Musa because he had earlier agitated against him. Ali was also apparently concerned about Abu Musa's political naivety, or about his neutrality. The alternatives proposed by Ali were Ibn Abbas and al-Ashtar, according to Ibn Muzahim, both of whom were rejected by al-Ash'ath and other Yemenites, and also by the Iraqi qurra. Veccia Vaglieri and Rahman write that the Iraqis were so convinced of the legitimacy of their cause that they insisted on the neutral Abu Musa, whereas others suggest that they were impressed by his piety, or his beautiful recitations of the Quran, or that he stood for provincial autonomy in Kufans' view. Mu'awiya was represented by his top general, Amr ibn al-As, who acted solely in the common interest of Mu'awiya and the Syrians.

==== Content of the agreement ====
The arbitration agreement was written and signed by both parties on 15 Safar, 37AH (2 August, 657 AD). Abu Musa and Amr represented Ali and Mu'awiya, respectively. The two representatives committed to meet on neutral territory, to adhere to the Quran and Sunnah and to save the community from war and division, a clause added evidently to appease the peace party. Citing Ibn Muzahim, Ayoub gives additional details: The arbitrators were to find guidance in the "uniting" and not "dividing" Sunnah of Muhammad, and to do so only if they could not find their answer in the Quran. Making peace was the only objective listed in the agreement, which also guaranteed the safety of the arbitrators and made their ruling binding. The agreement also initially referred to Ali by his official title of amir al-mu'minin (lit. 'commander of the faithful') but this was omitted at the behest of Mu'awiya, or Amr ibn al-As. This was pressed by al-Ash'ath upon Ali, who reluctantly accepted it, apparently comparing it with the Treaty of Hudaybiyya, in which Muhammad was not referred to as the messenger of God at the request of the infidels. Variations of this account are given by al-Tabari, Ibn Muzahim, al-Kufi, and Ibn Abi'l-Hadid. The agreement thus treated Ali and Mu'awiya as equal contenders for the caliphate, rather than a rebellious governor against the incumbent caliph. The two arbitrators were given a year to come to a decision, or until the end of Ramadan, some seven months later, but this deadline was flexible. In case they failed, hostilities would resume. Two days after this agreement both armies left the battlefield.

=== Seceders ===
As Ali returned to Kufa, some of his men seceded and gathered outside of Kufa in protest to the arbitration agreement. Bahramian puts their number at 12,000, citing al-Baladhuri and al-Tabari. Ali visited them and told them that they had opted for the arbitration despite his warnings, according to al-Tabari. The seceders agreed and told Ali that they had repented for their sins and now demanded that Ali followed suit. To this, he responded with the general declaration, "I repent to God and ask for his forgiveness for every sin," and also ensured them that the judgment of the arbitrators would not be binding if they deviated from the Quran and Sunnah. He thus largely regained their support at the time. But when the seceders returned to Kufa, they accused Ali of having nullified the arbitration agreement, which he denied, saying that he was committed to the formal agreement with Mu'awiya. Similar statements are attributed to Ali by Ibn Muzahim and Ibn Abi'l-Hadid, in which the caliph vows to uphold the covenant with Mu'awiya. In another account by al-Tabari, Ali cites verse 16:91 for upholding the treaty when two Kharijites, namely, Zur'a ibn al-Burj al-Ta'i and Hurqus ibn Zuhayr al-Sa'di, appealed to him to revoke it. Many of the dissidents apparently accepted Ali's position, while the rest left for al-Nahrawan, a town near al-Mada'in, and there declared Abd Allah ibn Wahb al-Rasibi (d. 658) as their leader. These formed the Kharijites (lit. ' seceders'), who later took up arms against Ali in the Battle of Nahrawan (658). They soon labeled anyone who opposed them as nonbelievers, who had to be fought, thus becoming the forerunners of Islamic terrorism, according to some.

==== Their motives ====
Donner suggests that the seceders, among them many of the qurra, may have feared being held accountable for their role in the assassination of Uthman. Alternatively, Hinds and Poonawala believe that the seceders were disillusioned with the arbitration process, particularly by the removal of Ali's title of amir al-mu'minin in the final agreement and by its reference to the Sunnah next to the Quran, as noted also in Waq'at Siffin. After being silent about it initially, the Syrians now said that they also wanted the arbitrators to judge whether the killing of Uthman was justified, about which the qurra had no doubts. Hinds and Poonawala thus regard the arbitration as a skillfully-planned maneuver to disintegrate the coalition of Ali. For Ayoub, the seceders were frustrated with a costly war that had achieved nothing and denounced the agreement that questioned the authority of the legitimate Muslim caliph, in their view.

==== Their slogan ====
Kharijites' slogan in Arabic, "No judgment but that of God"

The seceders adopted the slogan, "No judgment but that of God," highlighting their rejection of the arbitration (by men) in reference to the Quranic verse 49:9, "If two parties of the Believers fight with one another, make peace between them; but if one rebels against the other, then fight against the one that rebels, until they return to obedience to God." When they interrupted Ali's sermon with this slogan, he commented that it was a word of truth by which the seceders sought falsehood. He added that they were repudiating government even though a ruler was indispensable in the conduct of religion. Ali nevertheless did not bar their entry to mosques or deprive them of their shares in the treasury, saying that they should be fought only if they initiate hostilities.

== Arbitration ==
The accounts of the arbitration are highly tendentious. Nevertheless, after some months of preparation, or perhaps even a year after the initial agreement, it appears that the two arbitrators met together, first in Dumat al-Jandal, halfway between Iraq and Syria, and then in Udhruh, in southern Palestine. This is the understanding of Madelung, Veccia Vaglieri, Caetani, and Bahramian, while some others believe that the two arbitrators met only once.

=== First meeting ===
In Dumat al-Jandal, the proceedings lasted for (possibly three) weeks, likely extending to mid-April 658. The account of al-Tabari depicts Abu Musa as opposed to the caliphates of both Ali and Mu'awiya. As an early companion of Muhammad, it is similarly the understanding of Madelung that Abu Musa did not support the caliphate of Mu'awiya, a taliq. With a strong preference for peace among Muslims, Abu Musa was likely willing to confirm Ali as the caliph, provided that he would reinstate Mu'awiya as the governor of Syria, perhaps because he was well-liked by his army, and on the condition that Mu'awiya would, in turn, recognize Ali as the caliph. Ideally, however, Abu Musa may have preferred a broad shura that included Ali and Abd Allah ibn Umar. The latter was his son-in-law and a favorite for the caliphate. The similar account of Ibn Muzahim is that Abu Musa proposed removing Ali and installing the neutral Abd Allah ibn Umar for the caliphate, even though Abd Allah was probably uninterested in it. This attitude of Abu Musa is also evident in an account given by al-Kufi and al-Tabari, who write that Mu'awiya sent al-Mughira ibn Shu'ba to assess the arbitrators' progress. He reportedly asked both what they thought of those who remained neutral in the conflict between Ali and Mu'awiya. Abu Musa answered that they were the best of mankind for they did not carry its burden, while Amr answered that they were the worst of mankind for neither they upheld a truth nor repudiated a falsehood.

Perhaps as an opener for the peace negotiations, the two arbitrators first discussed the assassination of Uthman, most likely at the initiative of Amr. They reached the verdict that Uthman had been killed wrongfully and that Mu'awiya had the right to seek revenge, but could not agree on anything else, either because Amr blocked the choice of Ali for the caliphate or a fresh shura, or because Abu Musa was adamant in his opposition to Mu'awiya. Madelung views the verdict about Uthman as a political one, a judicial misjudgment, and a blunder of the naive Abu Musa, who might have hoped that Amr would later reciprocate his concession. From the perspective of Abu Musa himself, his verdict did not authorize Mu'awiya to claim the caliphate, a prerogative which was reserved for the Muhajirun in his view, as reported by Ibn al-Athir and Ibn Muzahim. The verdict was not made public but both parties learned of it anyway. In particular, Ali denounced the conduct of the two arbitrators as contrary to the Quran and began preparations for a second expedition to Syria.

=== Second meeting ===
Evidently not endorsed by Ali, the second meeting was convened in Udhruh in January 659, or in August–September 658, probably to discuss the succession to Ali. Not part of the arbitration process, this second meeting was solely an initiative of Mu'awiya, who also invited the sons of prominent companions to take part, including Abd Allah ibn Umar, Abd al-Rahman ibn Abi Bakr, Abd Allah ibn al-Zubayr, and some others. Some of these were from Hejaz and had remained neutral throughout the conflict, perhaps lured to Udhruh by the promise of a broad shura for choosing the next caliph. Their presence was nevertheless a major coup, suggests Madelung, because Hejaz was still controlled by Ali at the time. In particular, that Abd Allah ibn Umar accepted the invitation of Mu'awiya hints at his interest in the caliphate, contrary to the reports showing him uninterested. The negotiations failed eventually, as the two arbitrators could not agree on the next caliph: Amr supported Mu'awiya, while Abu Musa nominated his son-in-law Abd Allah ibn Umar, who stood down in the interest of unity by his own account, or because he was intimidated by Mu'awiya, who is said to have threatened him in the closing gala.

As for the final scene of the Udhruh meeting, one popular account is that Abu Musa deposed both Ali and Mu'awiya and called for a council to appoint the new caliph per his earlier agreement with Amr. When Amr took the stage, however, he deposed Ali and proclaimed Mu'awiya as caliph, thus breaking his agreement with Abu Musa. Similar variants of this account are recounted by Ibn Muzahim and al-Kufi. The Kufan delegation then reacted furiously to Abu Musa's concessions, and he fled to Mecca in disgrace, whereas Amr was well-received by Mu'awiya upon his return to Syria. The common view is that the arbitration failed, or was inconclusive. This sentiment is perhaps summed up by the early historian Khalifah ibn Khayyat (d. 854) in one sentence, "The arbiters agreed on nothing." The arbitration nevertheless strengthened the position of Mu'awiya and the support of the Syrians, while weakening the position of Ali and the support of the Iraqis.

== Aftermath ==
Following the collapse of the arbitration process, the Syrians formally recognized Mu'awiya as caliph at Jerusalem in 659, or by the end of April–May 658. Upon learning that Mu'awiya had claimed the caliphate, Ali broke off all communications with him and introduced a curse on him and his close retinue in his congregational prayers. Mu'awiya soon reciprocated by introducing a curse on Ali and his closest supporters. While Ali's coalition steadily disintegrated and Mu'awiya's ally Amr ibn al-As conquered Egypt from Ali's governor in July 658, Ali had to instead subdue the Kharijites at the Battle of Nahrawan. Just before embarking on his second campaign to Syria, Ali was assassinated by the Kharijite dissident Ibn Muljam during morning prayers at the Great Mosque of Kufa in January 661, as revenge for the Kharijites killed at Nahrawan. In the summer, Mu'awiya invaded Iraq with his Syrian army and compelled Ali's eldest son and successor Hasan, who had been chosen as caliph in Kufa, to abdicate the caliphate to him. Mu'awiya then entered Kufa and received the pledge of allegiance from the Iraqis, with his suzerainty being acknowledged throughout the Caliphate.

== See also ==
- Battle of Nahrawan
- Umayyad invasions of Egypt (657–658)

== Sources ==
- Abbas, Hassan (2021). The Prophet's Heir: The Life of Ali ibn Abi Talib. Yale University Press. ISBN 978-0-3002-5205-7.
- Adamec, Ludwig W. (2016). Historical Dictionary of Islam. Rowman & Littlefield. ISBN 9781442277243.
- Afsaruddin, Asma (2013). The First Muslims: History and Memory. Oneworld Publications. ISBN 9781780744483.
- Anthony, Sean W. (2013). "'Ali b. Abi Talib (ca. 599–661)". In Bowering, Gerhard; Crone, Patricia; Kadi, Wadad; Mirza, Mahan; Stewart, Devin J.; Zaman, Muhammad Qasim (eds.). The Princeton encyclopedia of Islamic political thought. Princeton University Press. pp. 30–32. ISBN 9780691134840.
- Aslan, Reza (2011). No god But God: The Origins, Evolution, and Future of Islam. Random House. ISBN 9780812982442.
- Ayoub, Mahmoud M. (2014). The Crisis of Muslim History: Religion and Politics in Early Islam. Oneworld Publications. ISBN 9781780746746.
- Bahramian, Ali (2015). "ʿAlī b. Abī Ṭālib 3. Caliphate". In Daftary, Farhad (ed.). Encyclopaedia Islamica. doi:10.1163/1875-9831_isla_COM_0252.
- Cappucci, John (2014). "'A'ISHA (614–678)". In Fitzpatrick, Coeli; Walker, Adam Hani (eds.). Muhammad in History, Thought, and Culture: An Encyclopedia of the Prophet of God. Vol. 1. ABC-CLIO. pp. 18–20. ISBN 9781610691789.
- Daftary, Farhad (2013). A History of Shi'i Islam. I.B. Tauris. ISBN 9780755608669.
- Dakake, Maria Massi (2012). The Charismatic Community: Shi'ite Identity in Early Islam. State University of New York Press. ISBN 9780791480342.
- Dakake, Maria Massi (2005). "Ṣiffīn, Battle of". In McAuliffe, Jane Dammen (ed.). Encyclopaedia of the Qurʼān. Vol. 5. pp. 1–2. ISBN 978-90-04-12356-4.
- Donaldson, Dwight M. (1933). The Shi'ite Religion: A History of Islam in Persia and Iraḳ. AMS Press.
- Donner, Fred M. (2010). Muhammad and the Believers: At the Origins of Islam. Harvard University Press. ISBN 9780674064140.
- Esposito, John L. (1992). Islam: The Straight Path. Oxford University Press. ISBN 9780195074727.
- Esposito, John L. (2004). The Oxford Dictionary of Islam. Oxford University Press. ISBN 9780199757268.
- Fadel, Mohammad (2013). "arbitration". In Bowering, Gerhard; Crone, Patricia; Kadi, Wadad; Mirza, Mahan; Stewart, Devin J.; Zaman, Muhammad Qasim (eds.). The Princeton Encyclopedia of Islamic Political Thought. Princeton University Press. pp. 43–44. ISBN 9780691134840.
- Feisal, Abdul Rauf (2007). "What Is Sunni Islam?". In Cornell, Vincent J. (ed.). Voices of Islam. Vol. 1. Praeger Publishers. pp. 185–216. ISBN 978-0-275-98732-9.
- Gibbon, Edward (1906). The History of the Decline and Fall of the Roman Empire. New York: Fred de Fau and Co. Publishers.
- Gibbon, Edward (1848). The Rise and Fall of the Roman Empire. Vol. 3. London.
- Glassé, Cyril, ed. (2001a). "'Alī ibn Abī Ṭālib (598–40/598–661)". The New Encyclopedia of Islam. AltaMira Press. pp. 39–441. ISBN 9780759101890.
- Glassé, Cyril, ed. (2001b). "'Amr ibn al-'Āsī (d. 42/663)". The New Encyclopedia of Islam. AltaMira Press. pp. 48–49. ISBN 9780759101890.
- Glassé, Cyril, ed. (2001c). "Shi'ism". The New Encyclopedia of Islam. AltaMira Press. pp. 422–428. ISBN 9780759101890.
- Gleave, Robert M. (2021). "ʿAlī b. Abī Ṭālib". Encyclopaedia of Islam (3rd ed.). Brill Reference Online.
- Hazleton, Lesley (2009). After the Prophet: The Epic Story of the Shia-Sunni Split in Islam. Knopf Doubleday Publishing Group. ISBN 9780385532099.
- Hinds, Martin (1972a). "The Murder of the Caliph 'Uthman". International Journal of Middle East Studies. 3 (4): 450–469. doi:10.1017/S0020743800025216. S2CID 159763369.
- Hinds, Martin (1972b). "The Siffin Arbitration Agreement". Journal of Semitic Studies. 17 (1): 93–129. doi:10.1093/jss/17.1.93.
- Hinds, M. (2012). "Muʿāwiya I". In Bearman, P.; Bianquis, Th.; Bosworth, C.E.; van Donzel, E.; Heinrichs, W.P. (eds.). Encyclopaedia of Islam (2nd ed.). doi:10.1163/1573-3912_islam_SIM_5279. ISBN 9789004161214.
- Jafri, S.H.M (1979). Origins and Early Development of Shia Islam. London: Longman.
- Kelsay, John (1993). Islam and War: A Study in Comparative Ethics. Westminster John Knox Press. ISBN 9780664253028.
- Kennedy, Hugh (2013). The Armies of the Caliphs: Military and Society in the Early Islamic State. Routledge. ISBN 9781134531134.
- Kennedy, Hugh (2015). The Prophet and the Age of the Caliphates: The Islamic Near East from the Sixth to the Eleventh Century. Routledge.
- Lapidus, Ira M. (2014). A History of Islamic Societies. Cambridge University Press. ISBN 9780521514309.
- Lecker, M. (2012). "Ṣiffīn". In Bearman, P.; Bianquis, Th.; Bosworth, C.E.; van Donzel, E.; Heinrichs, W.P. (eds.). Encyclopaedia of Islam (2nd ed.). doi:10.1163/1573-3912_islam_SIM_7018. ISBN 9789004161214.
- Levi Della Vida, G.; Khoury, R.G. (2012). "ʿUt̲h̲mān b. ʿAffān". In Bearman, P.; Bianquis, Th.; Bosworth, C.E.; van Donzel, E.; Heinrichs, W.P. (eds.). Encyclopaedia of Islam (2nd ed.). doi:10.1163/1573-3912_islam_COM_1315.
- Levi Della Vida (2021). "Kharidjites". Encyclopaedia of Islam (2nd ed.). Brill Reference Online.
- Lewis, Bernard (2002). Arabs in History. OUP Oxford. ISBN 9780191647161.
- McHugo, John (2018). A Concise History of Sunnis and Shi'is. Georgetown University Press. ISBN 9781626165885.
- Madelung, Wilferd (1997). The Succession to Muhammad: A Study of the Early Caliphate. Cambridge University Press. ISBN 0-521-64696-0.
- Momen, Moojan (1985). An Introduction to Shi'i Islam. Yale University Press. ISBN 9780853982005.
- Muir, William (1924). The Caliphate: Its Rise, Decline and Fall, From Original Sources. Religious tract society.
- Nasr, Seyyed Hossein; Afsaruddin, Asma (2021). "Ali". Encyclopedia Britannica.
- Petersen, Erling Ladewig (1958). "ʿAlī and Muʿāwiah: The rise of the Umayyad caliphate 656–661". Acta Orientalia. 23: 157–196.
- Petersen, Erling L. (2008) [1964]. Ali and Mu'awiya in Early Arabic Tradition: Studies on the Genesis and Growth of Islamic Historical Writing Until the End of the Ninth Century. Translated by Christensen, P. Lampe. Acls History E Book Project. ISBN 9781597404716.
- Poonawala, I.K. (1982). "ʿALĪ B. ABĪ ṬĀLEB I. Life". Encyclopaedia Iranica (Online ed.).
- Rahman, Habib Ur (1989). A Chronology of Islamic History, 570–1000 CE. G.K. Hall. ISBN 9780816190676.
- Shaban, M.A. (1970). Islamic History: Volume 1, AD 600–750 (AH 132): A New Interpretation. Cambridge University Press. ISBN 9780521291316.
- Shah-Kazemi, Reza (2014). "'Ali IBN ABI TALIB (599–661)". In Fitzpatrick, Coeli; Walker, Adam Hani (eds.). Muhammad in History, Thought, and Culture: An Encyclopedia of the Prophet of God. ABC-CLIO. pp. 20–24. ISBN 9781610691789.
- Shah-Kazemi, Reza (2006). "'ALI IBN ABI TALIB". In Meri, Josef W. (ed.). Medieval Islamic Civilization: An Encyclopedia. Routledge. pp. 36–47. ISBN 978-0415966900.
- Shah-Kazemi, Reza (2022). Imam 'Ali: Concise History, Timeless Mystery. I.B. Tauris.
- Shah-Kazemi, Reza (2015). "Imam Ali". In Daftary, Farhad; Sajoo, Amyn; Jiwa, Shainool (eds.). The Shi'i World: Pathways in Tradition and Modernity. Bloomsbury Publishing. ISBN 9780857727633.
- Tabatabai, Sayyid Mohammad Hosayn (1975). Shi'ite Islam. Translated by Sayyid Hossein Nasr. State University of New York Press. ISBN 0-87395-390-8.
- Veccia Vaglieri, L. (2012c). "al-As̲h̲ʿarī, Abū Mūsā". In Bearman, P.; Bianquis, Th.; Bosworth, C.E.; vanDonzel, E.; Heinrichs, W.P. (eds.). Encyclopaedia of Islam (2nd ed.). doi:10.1163/1573-3912_islam_SIM_0781.
- Veccia Vaglieri, L. (2021a). "Ali b. Abi Talib". Encyclopaedia of Islam (Second ed.). Brill Reference Online.
- Veccia Vaglieri, L. (2021c). "al- As̲h̲ʿarī, Abū Mūsā". Encyclopaedia of Islam (2nd ed.). Brill Reference Online.
- Veccia Vaglieri, L. (2021d). "al- D̲j̲amal". In Bearman, P. (ed.). Encyclopaedia of Islam (2nd ed.). Brill Reference Online.
- Veccia Vaglieri, Laura (1970). "The Patriarchal and Umayyad Caliphates". In Holt, Peter M.; Lambton, Ann K.S.; Lewis, Bernard (eds.). The Cambridge History of Islam. Vol. 1. Cambridge University Press. pp. 57–103.
- Wellhausen, Julius (1927). The Arab Kingdom and Its Fall. Translated by Weir, Margaret G. University of Calcutta.
