= Ibn Uthal =

7th-century physician of the Umayyad Caliphate

Ibn Uthal or Ibn Athal (Arabic: ابن أثال) was an Arab Christian from Damascus who was the personal physician of the caliph Mu'awiya I and was regarded as the most distinguished of the medical practitioners of the early Umayyad period. His medical knowledge can be considered a continuation of the tradition that existed in pre-Islamic Arabia. He was skilled in toxicology and was reportedly killed in a revenge attack.
