= Kharijite Rebellion =

Khawarij or Kharijite Rebellion may refer to:

- The Kharijite Rebellions against Ali (657–661)
- The Najdat revolt in Arabia (684–693)
- The Azariqa revolt in Persia (684–698)
- The revolt of Shabib ibn Yazid al-Shaybani in Iraq (696–698)
- The Berber Revolt in the Maghreb and al-Andalus (739–743)
- The rebellion of al-Dahhak ibn Qays al-Shaybani in Iraq (745–746)
- The Ibadi revolt in Arabia (747–748)
- The rebellion of al-Walid ibn Tarif al-Shaybani in al-Jazira (794–795)
- The Zanj Rebellion in Iraq and al-Ahwaz (869–883)
- The Kharijite Rebellion in al-Jazira (866–896)
