= Sufyan ibn al-Abrad al-Kalbi =

7th-century Umayyad general

Sufyan ibn al-Abrad al-Kalbi al-Asamm (Arabic: سفيان بن الأبرد الكلبي, romanized: Sufyān ibn al-Abrad al-Kalbī al-Aṣamm; fl. 684–701) was a general of the Umayyad Caliphate who served under caliphs Mu'awiya II (r. 683–684), Marwan I (r. 684–685) and Abd al-Malik (r. 685–705). He backed the latter against his own tribesmen during a coup attempt in 689. He was a key figure in securing the Umayyad hold over Iraq during the governorship of al-Hajjaj ibn Yusuf, helping the latter defeat the Kharijites in 696–697 and the rebellion of Abd al-Rahman ibn Muhammad ibn al-Ash'ath in 700–701.

== Origins ==
Sufyan ibn al-Abrad belonged to the Banu Kalb tribe, which was a key backer of the Umayyad dynasty during the leadership crisis over the Caliphate in the wake of Caliph Mu'awiya II's death and the Second Muslim Civil War. Sufyan's father was al-Abrad ibn Abi Umama ibn Qabus ibn Sufyan and, like the chief of the Syrian Kalb, Ibn Bahdal, they hailed from the tribe's princely clan, the Banu Haritha ibn Janab. Sufyan was nicknamed al-Asamm ('the deaf' or 'the undeterrable').

== Early activity ==
During the leadership crisis in Damascus, the governor of the province, al-Dahhak ibn Qays al-Fihri, refused to read a letter during the Friday prayer from Ibn Bahdal, that proclaimed the legitimacy of the Umayyads and the disparagement of their Mecca-based rival for the caliphate, Abd Allah ibn al-Zubayr. In reaction to his refusal, Sufyan was one of a number of Umayyad loyalists in attendance who repeated after the other the contents of the letter. They were subsequently jailed by al-Dahhak. However, a group of Kalbi tribesmen soon after went to the prison and freed Sufyan.

Marwan I acceded with the critical help of the Kalb, and was succeeded by his son Abd al-Malik in 685. In 689, Sufyan and Ibn Bahdal backed Abd al-Malik against the Umayyad prince Amr ibn Said al-Ashdaq when the latter rebelled and seized the capital Damascus during Abd al-Malik's absence. Sufyan fought against Humayd ibn Hurayth ibn Bahdal, another senior Kalbi, and his own brother, Zuhayr ibn al-Abrad. The leading Kalbi warriors on either side dueled with each other during the standoff outside the caliph's palace, where al-Ashdaq had barricaded himself. They were ultimately compelled by their womenfolk and children not to shed each other's blood for the sake of the Umayyads. Al-Ashdaq ultimately surrendered and was executed by Abd al-Malik.

== Military career ==
Abd al-Malik dispatched Sufyan at the head of a regiment of Syrian troops to reinforce the governor of Iraq, al-Hajjaj ibn Yusuf. The latter, with his Iraqi troops, had been unable to repel a Kharijite assault on Kufa led by Shabib ibn Yazid al-Shaybani and requested Syrian troops. Sufyan's men defeated the rebels, pursued Shabib and killed the Kharijite leader in a battle at Ahwaz in 696–697. Sufyan was later sent to pursue another Kharijite band, that of the Azariqa, in Tabaristan, where his forces, together with a Kufan army led by Ishaq ibn Muhammad ibn al-Ash'ath, killed their leader Qatari ibn al-Fuja'a.

In 700–701, Sufyan led the small Syrian contingent that held out with al-Hajjaj in Basra during the mass revolt of the Iraqi tribal nobility led by Abd al-Rahman ibn Muhammad ibn al-Ash'ath. After a month of repulsing Iraqi attacks, Sufyan led his men in a charge against the rebels and forced them to withdraw to Kufa. Later, when al-Hajjaj received significant reinforcements from Abd al-Malik, Sufyan commanded the Syrian cavalry that stamped out the revolt.

== Assessment ==
The historian Antoine Borrut describes Sufyan as "an astute general with outstanding military skills, who was celebrated for his bravery" and the historian Hugh N. Kennedy calls him a veteran commander "who did so much to secure Iraq for the Umayyads". He was among the forerunners of the professional commanders who emerged under the Abbasid Caliphate.

== Bibliography ==
- Bosworth, Clifford Edmund (1968). Sīstān Under the Arabs: From the Islamic Conquest to the Rise of the Ṣaffārids. Ismeo.
- Caskel, Werner (1966). Ğamharat an-nasab: Das genealogische Werk des His̆ām ibn Muḥammad al-Kalbī, Volume II (in German). Leiden: Brill. OCLC 490272940.
- Kennedy, Hugh (2001). The Armies of the Caliphs: Military and Society in the Early Islamic State. Routledge. ISBN 0-415-25092-7.
- Borrut, Antoine (2014). "al-Aṣamm, Sufyān b. al-Abrad al-Kalbī". The Encyclopedia of Islam Three. Brill. pp. 6–8.
- Rihan, Mohamed (2014). The Politics and Culture of an Umayyad Tribe: Conflict and Factionalism in the Early Islamic Period. I. B. Tauris. ISBN 1780765649.
- Fishbein, Michael, ed. (1990). The History of al-Ṭabarī, Volume XXI: The Victory of the Marwānids, A.D. 685–693/A.H. 66–73. SUNY Series in Near Eastern Studies. Albany, New York: State University of New York Press. ISBN 978-0-7914-0221-4.
- Hawting, G. R., ed. (1989). The History of al-Ṭabarī, Volume XX: The Collapse of Sufyānid Authority and the Coming of the Marwānids: The Caliphates of Muʿāwiyah II and Marwān I and the Beginning of the Caliphate of ʿAbd al-Malik, A.D. 683–685/A.H. 64–66. SUNY Series in Near Eastern Studies. Albany, New York: State University of New York Press. ISBN 978-0-88706-855-3.
