= Abu Bilal Mirdas =

Leader of quietist Kharijites of Basra

- Died: 681; Tawwaj/Darabjird, Fars province
- Era: Umayyad Caliphate
- Known for: Early Kharijite leader
- Opponent: Ubayd Allah ibn Ziyad
- Parents: Hudayr ibn Amr (father); Udayya (mother)
- Relatives: Urwa ibn Udayya (brother)

Abu Bilal Mirdas ibn Udayya al-Tamimi (Arabic: أبو بلال مرداس بن أدية التميمي, romanized: ʾAbū Bilāl Mirdās ibn ʾUdayya al-Tamīmī; died 681) was the leader of quietist Kharijites of Basra during the early years of the Umayyad Caliphate. He was the brother of Urwa ibn Udayya, one of the instigator of the Kharijite movement at the Battle of Siffin, in which Abu Bilal himself participated. After the defeat of the Kharijites at the Battle of Nahrawan in 658, he adopted political quietism and opposed the extremist Kharijites. In 680, in response to persecution by the Umayyad governor Ubayd Allah ibn Ziyad, Abu Bilal rose in rebellion and was killed in 681. His piety, military exploits, and death, which was seen by many as martyrdom, immortalized him among the later Kharijite circles. He is counted among the imams of the extinct Sufrism sect of the Kharijites and is venerated in Ibadism to this day.

== Origin and early career ==
Abu Bilal was from the Rabia ibn Hanzala branch of Banu Tamim tribe, which provided a series of Kharijite leaders. Although his father's name was Hudayr ibn Amr, he was known by his mother's name Udayya. He was a resident of the Iraqi garrison town of Basra. Little is known of his early life.

After the assassination of the third caliph Uthman in 656 by provincial rebels, the caliphate fell into civil war as Mu'awiya ibn Abi Sufyan, a relative of Uthman and the governor of Syria, challenged the legitimacy of the new caliph Ali. The indecisive battle between the two at Siffin ended in an arbitration agreement in July 657. Asserting that human arbitration was invalid as God's command was clear that the rebels (in this case Mu'awiya) had to be fought and overcome, some of Ali's soldiers left the army. They were called Kharijites following this secession. Abu Bilal's brother Urwa ibn Udayya is reported to have been the first person to raise the slogan of la hukma illa li-llah (judgment belongs to God alone), which later became the characteristic Kharijite slogan, against the arbitration. Abu Bilal himself was present at the battle and was among the seceders. He later fought against Ali in the Battle of Nahrawan in July 658 where the caliph crushed the Kharijite insurgents. Following Ali's assassination in 661 by a Kharijite, Mu'awiya became the sole ruler, establishing the Umayyad Caliphate.

== Leader of the Basran quietists ==
After the defeat at Nahrawan, where many of the senior Kharijite leaders were killed, Abu Bilal gave up armed insurrection and returned to Basra along with his brother Urwa. As Basra became the center of the anti-state Kharijite insurrections during the reign of Mu'awiya, Abu Bilal is reported to have cursed the insurgents. He was opposed to the extremist Kharijite factions and condemned their doctrine of isti'rad—indiscriminate killing of the non-Kharijite Muslims. He also disapproved of women's participation in Kharijite rebellions which was held obligatory by the activist Kharijites. These views and his status as one of the earliest Kharijites earned him much respect and leading position among the non-activist Kharijites of Basra. The quietists were later known as Sufrism and Abu Bilal is counted among their imams.

Umayyad governor Ubayd Allah ibn Ziyad suppressed the Kharijite disturbances and imprisoned many of them including Abu Bilal. According to the account of Umar ibn Shabba (d. 877), the jailer was impressed by Abu Bilal's piety and permitted him to spend the nights at his home and return in the mornings. Upon learning that Ibn Ziyad intended to kill all the Kharijite prisoners the next morning, one of Abu Bilal's confidants reported this to his family. Despite this, Abu Bilal returned to the prison the next morning. Moved by this, the jailer pleaded to Ibn Ziyad who spared Abu Bilal's life and released him, while the others were killed.

== Revolt and death ==
Basra and approximate locations of some of Abu Bilal's battles

Ibn Ziyad is said to have severely persecuted the Kharijites after his conciliatory measures had failed. According to the account of al-Tabari (d. 923), Abu Bilal's brother Urwa accused Ibn Ziyad of sinful conduct and tyranny. Ibn Ziyad had him arrested and his hands and feet cut off. Urwa was later executed along with his daughter. A Kharijite woman named Bathja (or Balja or Baltha), who had been vocal against Ibn Ziyad, was arrested and tortured to death in the market of Basra. Provoked by these incidents, (Note: According to another account, however, Urwa's execution occurred after Abu Bilal's death.) Abu Bilal abandoned his quietism and revolted in 60 AH (680). With forty men he left Basra and established himself in Ahwaz. In contrast to looting and murder by extremist Kharijites, he remained peaceful but collected taxes equivalent to the stipend of himself and his followers. Ibn Ziyad sent against him an army of 2,000 under the command of Aslam ibn Zur'a al-Kilabi. Despite being far inferior in numbers, the Kharijites defeated the Basran force in the encounter at the village of Asak near Ramhurmuz. Ibn Zur'a narrowly escaped being captured by a Kharijite named Ma'bad. He was mocked and humiliated in Basra for his embarrassing defeat at the hands of such a tiny force. People in the market of Basra taunted him: "Abu Bilal is behind you!", "Oh Ma'bad, capture him!" Ibn Ziyad had to deploy his personal guards to rescue Ibn Zur'a.

In the year 61 AH (680–681) Ibn Ziyad sent another army, 4,000-strong (3,000 according to another account), led by Abbad ibn Akhdar al-Tamimi, a fellow tribesman of Abu Bilal. According to al-Tabari, Abbad caught up with Abu Bilal near the village of Tawwaj (near modern-day Shiraz) in the Fars province. In the ensuing battle, the Kharijites were enveloped and quickly slaughtered. According to a variant account reported in al-Kamil of al-Mubarrad (d. 899) and Ansab al-Ashraf of al-Baladhuri (d. 892), Abbad overtook the Kharijites near Darabjird, also in Fars. It was Friday and both parties agreed to perform the Friday prayers before fighting. While the Kharijites were busy praying, the Basrans attacked and massacred them. Abu Bilal's head was cut off and taken to Ibn Ziyad.

== Aftermath of Abu Bilal's death ==
As soon as Abbad returned to Basra, a group of four Kharijites at the head of Ubayda ibn Hilal killed him and his son in vengeance for Abu Bilal. The Kharijites were aroused by Abu Bilal's death, which contributed to the explosion of the Kharijite activity in the aftermath of Caliph Yazid's death in 683. Ubayda soon rose in rebellion with the battle cry "I am of the religion of Abu Bilal!" Abu Bilal was seen by the Kharijites as a holy saint and a true martyr; his death was sung by Kharijite poets. Among the Sufrites, his memory was cherished for a long time. The Ibadi Kharijites venerate him to this day and see him as a model of principled resistance against tyranny. In the Ibadi political theory, an imam al-shari (activist leader), as opposed to the imam al-kitman (leader in the state of dissimulation) and imam al-zahur (head of an Ibadi state), is a leader who actively resists oppression and struggles to establish an Ibadi state. Abu Bilal is seen by them as a prototype of the imam al-shari. His story is frequently mentioned in the Ibadi literature. Several anecdotes of his piety are reported even in non-Kharijite sources which portray him as a saintly figure. According to the historian Adam Gaiser, these might have entered these sources from earlier Kharijite writings. His fame was such that even some Shia and Mu'tazilites denied that he was a Kharijite and claimed him as one of their own.

== Sources ==
- Donner, Fred M. (2010). Muhammad and the Believers, at the Origins of Islam. Cambridge, MA: Harvard University Press. ISBN 9780674050976.
- Gaiser, Adam (2016). Shurāt Legends, Ibāḍī Identities. Columbia, SC: The University of South Carolina Press. ISBN 978-1-61117-677-3.
- Gaiser, Adam (2020). "Mirdās b. Udayya". In Fleet, Kate; Krämer, Gudrun; Matringe, Denis; Nawas, John; Rowson, Everett (eds.). Encyclopaedia of Islam (3rd ed.). Brill Online. doi:10.1163/1573-3912_ei3_COM_36473. ISSN 1873-9830.
- Howard, I. K. A., ed. (1990). The History of al-Ṭabarī, Volume XIX: The Caliphate of Yazīd ibn Muʿāwiyah, A.D. 680–683/A.H. 60–64. SUNY Series in Near Eastern Studies. Albany, New York: State University of New York Press. ISBN 978-0-7914-0040-1.
- Levi Della Vida, G. (1993). "Mirdās b. Udayya". In Bosworth, C. E.; van Donzel, E.; Heinrichs, W. P. & Pellat, Ch. (eds.). The Encyclopaedia of Islam, Second Edition. Volume VII: Mif–Naz. Leiden: E. J. Brill. pp. 123–124. ISBN 978-90-04-09419-2.
- Madelung, Wilferd & Lewinstein, K. (1997). "Ṣufriyya". In Bosworth, C. E.; van Donzel, E.; Heinrichs, W. P. & Lecomte, G. (eds.). The Encyclopaedia of Islam, Second Edition. Volume IX: San–Sze. Leiden: E. J. Brill. pp. 766–767. ISBN 978-90-04-10422-8.
- Morony, Michael G., ed. (1987). The History of al-Ṭabarī, Volume XVIII: Between Civil Wars: The Caliphate of Muʿāwiyah, 661–680 A.D./A.H. 40–60. SUNY Series in Near Eastern Studies. Albany, New York: State University of New York Press. ISBN 978-0-87395-933-9.
- Watt, W. Montgomery (1973). The Formative Period of Islamic Thought. Edinburgh, Scotland: Edinburgh University Press. ISBN 9780852242452.
- Wellhausen, Julius (1901). Die religiös-politischen Oppositionsparteien im alten Islam (in German). Berlin: Weidmannsche buchhandlung. OCLC 453206240.
