= Qatari ibn al-Fuja'a =

Late 7th-century Arab poet and Kharijite leader

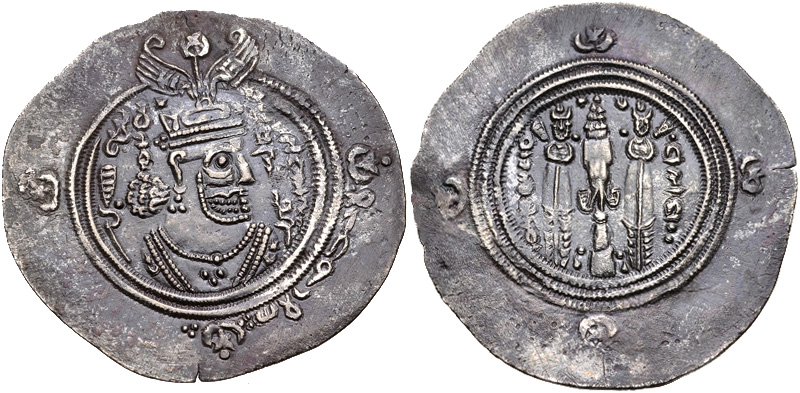
- Silver Dirham minted in the name of Qatari (694–695 CE)
- Born: Qatari ibn al-Fuja'a al-Mazini al-Tamimi; Al Khuwayr, Umayyad Caliphate (present-day Qatar)
- Died: c. 698–699 CE; Semnan, Persia (present-day Iran)
- Cause of death: Killed in battle
- Years active: 687–698/699
- Known for: Leader of the Azariqa sub-sect
- Title: Amir al-Mu'minin (leader of the faithful)
- Predecessor: Nafi ibn al-Azraq
- Successor: Movement disbanded

Qaṭari ibn al-Fujaʾa (Arabic: قطري بن الفجاءة; died c. 698–699 CE) was a Kharjite leader and poet. Born in Al Khuwayr, he ruled over the Azariqa faction of the Kharjites for more than ten years after the death of Nafi ibn al-Azraq in c. 685 CE. He led an uprising against the Umayyad Caliphate for more than 20 years. Despite commanding only a small group of Bedouin Arabs, Qatari ibn al-Fujaa managed to control much of Persia, causing significant death and destruction, which earned him the nickname "Father of Death", until he was ultimately defeated by the Umayyad forces.

Ibn Khallikan, a 13th-century Muslim scholar, states that 'Qatari' is not his given name, but instead refers to the name of the region where he hailed from. A member of the Banu Tamim tribe, he held the title of Amir al-Mu'minin, which translates to 'leader of the faithful' and was the formal title of the Caliphs. His nicknames were Na'ama (ostrich) and Abu al-Mawt (father of death). It has been asserted that he was the first Kharijite leader to promote jihadism, as his poems glorified courage, death and war in the name of God.

He minted the first known Kharijite coins, the earliest of which dated to 688 or 689. It was minted in the Arab-Sasanian style. The coin bore the Pahlavi inscription "‛Abdallah Qatari, the Commander of the Faithful, who has increased the royal glory".

== Role in Azariqa faction ==
In 687, Ibn al-Fuja'a assumed leadership over the Azariqa sub-sect of the Khawarij sect of Islam during the Second Fitna. Leading his troops from Kerman, he recaptured portions of Ahvaz and marched towards Basra.

Around 698 or 699, the governor of Iraq al-Hajjaj ibn Yusuf sent two of his generals, al-Muhallab ibn Abi Sufra and Sufyan ibn al-Abrad al-Kalbi, to attack Ibn al-Fuja'a and his men who were encamped in Tabaristan. After fleeing to Semnan, Ibn al-Fuja'a was confronted by Sufyan's forces. Ibn al Fuja'a's forces were defeated and he was decapitated in the encounter. Shortly after the battle, the remnants of the Azariqa faction met their demise under the leadership of 'Abida ibn Hilal, marking the end of the Islamic sub-sect.
