= Najdat =

Sub-sect of Kharjite movement

The Najdat were the sub-sect of the Kharijite movement that followed Najda ibn 'Amir al-Hanafi, and in 682 launched a revolt against the Umayyad Caliphate in the historical provinces of Yamama and Bahrain, in central and eastern Arabia.

Among the beliefs of the Najdat were:

- Allowing the concealment of their true beliefs, if they were in territories where the Sunnis dominated.
- Sinning Muslims were not excommunicated as unbelievers. The Najdat believed that they could be forgiven by Allah - only he who persisted in his sin and repeatedly committed it, could be accused of unbelief.

== Background ==
After the assassination of the third caliph Uthman in 656 by provincial rebels, the caliphate fell into civil war as Mu'awiya ibn Abi Sufyan, a relative of Uthman and the governor of Syria, challenged the legitimacy of the new caliph Ali. The indecisive battle between the two at Siffin ended in an arbitration agreement in July 657. Asserting that human arbitration was invalid as God's command was clear that the rebels (in this case Mu'awiya) had to be fought and overcome, some of Ali's soldiers left the army. They were called Kharijites following this secession. They later fought against Ali in the Battle of Nahrawan in July 658 and were crushed by the Caliph. Following Ali's assassination in 661 by a Kharijite, Mu'awiya became the sole ruler, establishing the Umayyad Caliphate. During his reign, the Kharijites flourished in the southern Iraqi city of Basra. Severely repressed by the Iraqi governor Ziyad ibn Abih and later Ubayd Allah ibn Ziyad, the Kharijites fled to Arabia around 680.

== History ==
After Mu'awiya's death in 680, the Muslim empire fell to civil war. Denouncing the new caliph Yazid, the Qurayshi leader Abd Allah ibn al-Zubayr established himself in the sanctuary of Mecca. When Yazid sent an army to end the rebellion in 683 and Mecca was besieged, Kharijites assisted Abd Allah ibn al-Zubayr in defending the city. However, Yazid died in November 683 and Ibn al-Zubayr proclaimed himself caliph. Kharijites, after discovering that Ibn al-Zubayr had proclaimed caliphate and did not share their view of Uthman and condemned his murder, abandoned him. Some of them went to Yamama, in central Arabia, under the leadership of Abu Talut, whereas the majority went to Basra. In the meantime, Basran tribal chiefs expelled Ibn Ziyad and the city fell to tribal warfare. Kharijites, under the leadership of Nafi ibn al-Azraq, took over the city, killed the deputy appointed by Ibn Ziyad and broke 140 of their comrades free from Ibn Ziyad's prison. Soon afterwards, Basrans recognized Ibn al-Zubayr and he appointed Umar ibn Ubayd Allah ibn Ma'mar his governor there. Umar drove the Kharijites out of Basra and they escaped to Ahwaz. Doctrinal differences between Nafi and Najda ibn Amir al-Hanafi, another of the leaders, led to a split within the group.

Najda, with his followers, returned to Yamama and the faction became known as Najdat. In 685, after some particular successes, the Kharijite faction of Abu Talut recognized Najda as their leader. Najda started raiding towns in Ibn al-Zuabyr's domains. In 687 a group led by Atiyya ibn al-Aswad split up and headed to Sistan where they founded their own Kharijite branch. In the same year, Najda invaded Yemen and seized it, including Sanaa, and his lieutenant Abu-Fudayk conquered the Hadramaut. The Najdat now controlled the most peripheral areas of the caliphate and therefore most adequate to avoid the oppression of caliphate forces. The Najdat then began their conquest of Hejaz where, after the defeat of Abd Allah ibn al-Zubayr, they suffered an attack from Muhammad's cousin Abd Allah ibn Abbas. Here they blocked supplies to Mecca and Medina and isolated Taizz, but did not want to attack the holy villages.

The Kharijite Najdat faction and Najda bin Amir al-Hanafi excommunicated Husayn bin Numayr, fighting against them in the Battle of Jabal al-Haruriyya. In this battle, eight thousand of ummayed soldier were killed, while Husayn bin Numayr managed to escape.

At this point the Najdat dominated almost all of Arabia. However, an ideological split severed their ranks, between those who favored the continuation of the fight against the Umayyad "usurpers" and those who were in favor of a treaty with Damascus. Subsequently, some of Najda's supporters began to object to certain beliefs of his and rebelled against him. The intransigents, led by 'Atiya al-it Hanafī, took refuge in the Iranian region of Helmand, assuming the title of Atawiyya, while some more radical Najdat, led by Abu Fudayk, murdered Najda himself in 691 and took his place. They later tried to fight against the Umayyad caliph Abd al-Malik ibn Marwan. In 692 Fudayk repelled a caliphate attack from Basra, but they were eventually defeated by the caliphate in 693, at the battle of Mushahhar.

Politically exterminated, Najdat retreated into obscurity and disappeared around the tenth century.

== See also ==
- Kharijites
- Kharijite Rebellions against Ali

== Sources ==
- Crone, Patricia (1998). "A Statement by the Najdiyya Khārijites on the Dispensability of the Imamate". Studia Islamica (88). Leiden: Brill: 55–76. doi:10.2307/1595697. ISSN 0585-5292. JSTOR 1595697. OCLC 5547948728.
- Donner, Fred M. (2010). Muhammad and the Believers, at the Origins of Islam. Cambridge, MA: Harvard University Press. ISBN 9780674050976.
- Dixon, Abd al-Ameer A. (1971). The Umayyad Caliphate, 65–86/684–705: (a Political Study). London: Luzac. ISBN 978-0718901493.
- Gaiser, Adam (2010). Muslims, Scholars, Soldiers: The Origin and Elaboration of the Ibadi Imamate Traditions. Oxford: Oxford University Press. ISBN 9780199738939.
- Morony, Michael (1984). Iraq After the Muslim Conquest. Princeton: Princeton University Press. ISBN 0-691-05395-2.
- Rotter, Gernot (1982). Die Umayyaden und der zweite Bürgerkrieg (680-692) (in German). Wiesbaden: Deutsche Morgenländische Gesellschaft. ISBN 9783515029131.
- Rubinacci, R. (1960). "Azāriḳa". In Gibb, H. A. R.; Kramers, J. H.; Lévi-Provençal, E.; Schacht, J.; Lewis, B. & Pellat, Ch. (eds.). The Encyclopaedia of Islam, Second Edition. Volume I: A–B. Leiden: E. J. Brill. pp. 810–811. OCLC 495469456.
- Watt, W. Montgomery (1973). The Formative Period of Islamic Thought. Edinburgh, Scotland: Edinburgh University Press. ISBN 9780852242452.
- Wellhausen, Julius (1901). Die religiös-politischen Oppositionsparteien im alten Islam (in German). Berlin: Weidmannsche buchhandlung. OCLC 453206240.
