= Najda ibn Amir al-Hanafi =

Head of Kharijite state from 685 to 691/692

Najda ibn Amir al-Hanafi (Arabic: نجدة بن عامر الحنفي, romanized: Najda ibn ʿĀmir al-Ḥanafī; c. 655–691/92) was the head of a breakaway Kharijite state in central and eastern Arabia between 685 and his death at the hands of his own partisans. His emergence formed part of the Second Muslim Civil War and the faction he led stood in opposition to the Umayyad Caliphate, which controlled Syria and Egypt, and the caliphate of Abd Allah ibn al-Zubayr, which controlled the Hejaz and Iraq.

== Early life and career ==
Najda was born in circa 655 and belonged to the Banu Hanifa subtribe of the Banu Bakr, resident in the Yamama (central Arabia). As a young man, he already wielded considerable influence among the Kharijites of the Banu Hanifa in his home region. In 680, he launched a rebellion in the Yamama against the Umayyad Caliphate, roughly coinciding with the Umayyads' suppression of Husayn ibn Ali's revolt during the Battle of Karbala. During the 683 Umayyad siege of Mecca, where the anti-Umayyad opposition leader Abd Allah ibn al-Zubayr was holed up, Najda and his horsemen came to Ibn al-Zubayr's aid. Following the lifting of the siege, Ibn al-Zubayr declared himself caliph and Najda and other Kharijite leaders left for Basra. There, under the leadership of the Kharijite leader Nafi ibn al-Azraq, they confronted the army of their erstwhile ally, Ibn al-Zubayr, who sought to capture the city in 684 after its Umayyad governor had been ousted. The city and its Arab garrison ultimately recognized Ibn al-Zubayr's suzerainty and the Kharijites relocated to nearby Ahwaz.

== Leader of the Kharijites in Arabia ==
Political differences emerged between Najda and Nafi, leading the former to defect and return to the Yamama, where the Kharijites were led by Abu Talut Salim ibn Matar. Abu Talut had seized Jawn al-Khadarim, a massive agricultural tract in the Yamama that was previously owned by the Banu Hanifa but seized by the Umayyad caliph Mu'awiya I (r. 661–680), and distributed among his followers its lands and the 4,000 slaves Mu'awiya had sent to till the lands. In 685, Najda and his retinue intercepted at Jabala a Mecca-bound caravan from Basra and distributed the loot among his Kharijite partisans in Jawn al-Khadarim, whom he also advised to continue utilizing the slaves they captured to work the fields after they had been freed from this labor. His actions and advice brought him distinction among the Kharijites of the Yamama and when he proposed to be their leader, he gained their unanimous support, including from Abu Talut, who stepped down. Thenceforth, the Kharijite movement in Arabia at the time was named the Najdat after Najda.

Not long after he became leader, Najda launched a raid against the Banu Ka'b, a branch of the Banu Amir, in Bahrayn (eastern Arabia) and landed a heavy blow to them at the Battle of Dhu'l-Majaz, seizing the corn and dates that the Banu Ka'b had looted from a nearby market. Najda's victory signaled the start of a series of victories that would ultimately give him control over most of Arabia to the detriment of Ibn al-Zubayr, who proved incapable of confronting the Kharijites. In 686, he returned to Bahrayn, this time attacking the Banu Abd al-Qays tribe, which opposed the Kharijites. With the assistance of the Azd tribe, he slew or captured many Abd al-Qays tribesmen in Qatif, where he headquartered himself afterward. Najda's increasing strength and control of Bahrayn and the Yamama threatened the contiguity of Ibn al-Zubayr's caliphate by blocking the routes between his headquarters in Mecca and his key province of Basra. Ibn al-Zubayr's son, the governor of Basra, Hamza, attempted to rollback Najda's gains in Bahrayn by dispatching against the Kharijites a 14,000-strong army led by Abd Allah ibn Umayr al-Laythi. However, Najda and his men ambushed and scattered the Zubayrid force in 686.

After his victory against the Zubayrid army, Najda dispatched his lieutenant Atiyya ibn al-Aswad al-Hanafi to capture Oman from its chieftains Abbad ibn Abd Allah al-Julandi and his sons Sa'id and Sulayman. Atiyya succeeded, held the region for a few months then left it to his deputy, a certain Abu'l-Qasim, but the latter was soon after killed by Sa'id and Sulayman, who with local support recaptured Oman. Ties between Najda and Atiyya became frayed, possibly as a result of the former's unequal distribution of pay and communications with the Umayyad caliph, Abd al-Malik, who controlled Syria and Egypt. By 687, Najda had conquered northern Bahrayn, forcing the Banu Tamim of Kazima to pay tribute. In the ensuing months, he entered Sana'a in Yemen and sent his deputy Abu Fudayk to Hadramawt; both places gave their allegiance to Najda and paid him tribute. By dint of these territorial gains, Najda became more powerful in Arabia than Ibn al-Zubayr, whose power in the peninsula was thereafter confined to the Hejaz (western Arabia). Najda's growing influence prompted Abd al-Malik, who was preoccupied with domestic and external crises, to appeal for Najda's support and recognition of his caliphate. Abd al-Malik offered the Kharijite leader the formal governorship of the Yamama and a pardon for the bloodshed and financial losses he caused in Arabia if he would recognize Abd al-Malik as caliph. Najda rejected the offer, but maintained friendly relations with the Umayyad caliph. Abd al-Malik achieved his goal, according to historian Abd al-Ameer Dixon, who held that by approaching Najda, Abd al-Malik sought either win him over and temporarily utilize him against Ibn al-Zubayr or, should be unsuccessful in this regard, to at least drive a wedge between Najda and his partisans.

Najda led his partisans to the Hajj pilgrimage in Mecca in June 687, attending alongside the partisans of Ibn al-Zubayr and Abd al-Malik. According to Dixon, this demonstrated Ibn al-Zubayr powerlessness to prevent Najda from entering his capital city and that "Najda was equal in power" at the time to both Abd al-Malik and Ibn al-Zubayr. At the conclusion of the Hajj, Najda attempted to head north to capture Medina, but abandoned the campaign out of religious concerns; Medina's pro-Zubayrid defenders had made preparations to resist such an attack and their leader, Abd Allah ibn Umar, was held in high regard by the Kharijites. Instead, Najda approached Ta'if, near Mecca, where its leader 'Amir ibn Urwa ibn Mas'ud al-Thaqafi gave Najda his allegiance. Najda relocated to nearby Tabala, assigned al-Haruq al-Hanafi governor of Ta'if, Sarat and Tabala (all in the Hejaz), and charged Sa'd al-Talayi' to collect tribute from the Banu Hilal tribe of Najran, before returning to his headquarters in Bahrayn. Upon his return to Bahrayn, he ordered that food provisions destined for Mecca and Medina be blocked to pressure Ibn al-Zubayr; he rescinded the order following appeals by pious individuals, notably Abd Allah ibn Abbas. At the peak of Najda's power, divisions among his Kharijite partisans ultimately led to his downfall. Domestic opposition regarding Najda's friendly ties to Abd al-Malik, unequal distribution of military pay and favorable treatment to his associates despite their religious offenses culminated with Abu Fudayk killing Najda in Bahrayn in 691/92.

== See also ==
- Kharijites
- Kharijite Rebellions against Ali

== Bibliography ==
- Dixon, 'Abd al-Ameer 'Abd (1969). The Umayyad Caliphate, 65–86/684–705: A Political Study (PhD diss.). London: University of London SOAS. OCLC 652842483.
- Dixon, 'Abd al-Ameer 'Abd (1971). The Umayyad Caliphate: 65–86/684–705 (A Political Study). London: Luzac & Company. ISBN 9780718901493. OCLC 833121104. (revised version of Dixon 1969)
- Rubinacci, R. (1993). "Nadjadāt". In Bosworth, C. E.; van Donzel, E.; Heinrichs, W. P. & Pellat, Ch. (eds.). The Encyclopaedia of Islam, Second Edition. Volume VII: Mif–Naz. Leiden: E. J. Brill. pp. 858–859. doi:10.1163/1573-3912_islam_COM_0831. ISBN 978-90-04-09419-2.
- Wellhausen, Julius (1927). The Arab Kingdom and Its Fall. Translated by Margaret Graham Weir. Calcutta: University of Calcutta. OCLC 752790641.
