= Shabib ibn Yazid al-Shaybani =

Kharijite rebel in Iraq (c. 646 – c. 697)

- Born: 646 or 647
- Died: 697 or 698; Dujayl Canal
- Cause of death: Drowning
- Spouse: Ghazala
- Children: Suhari
- Father: Yazid ibn Nu'aym

Shabīb ibn Yazīd ibn Nuʿaym al-Shaybānī (Arabic: شبيب بن يَزيد بن نعيم الشيباني) (646/47 – 697/98) was the leader of the Kharijite rebellion against the Umayyad Caliphate in central Iraq between 696 and his death in 697/98.

== Life ==
=== Origins and early career ===
Shabib was born in September/October 646 or 647. He was the son of a Kufan emigrant to Mosul, Yazid ibn Nu'aym. They hailed from the Banu Shayban tribe, specifically the clan of Banu Muhallam ibn Dhuhl. Yazid participated in the frontier raids against the Byzantine Empire under the command of Salman ibn Rabi'a al-Bahili. During one of the raids, he married a woman who bore him a son, Shabib. The latter was apparently raised in Mosul or the nearby village of Satidama. Shabib fought against the Kurds of the region as a member of the Muslim army, and for a time received a regular stipend, which was later terminated during the reign of Caliph Abd al-Malik (r. 685–705) because he did not respond to a call to arms.

=== Revolt ===
There is little information about the Kharijite beliefs of Shabib, but his revolt against the Umayyads, who had reasserted control over Iraq by 691, was the object of fascination for medieval Muslim and Christian historians, which depict him as a "fearless guerrilla leader", according to the modern historian Karl Vilhelm Zetterstéen. Though other early Muslim sources dispute it, the account of Abu Mikhnaf holds that Shabib began his career with the Kharijites as a soldier in the army of the Kharijite ascetic Salih ibn Musarrih, and succeeded him when the latter was slain in the village of al-Muddabaj in September 695.

Shabib led the remnants of Ibn Musarrih's army, which mostly consisted of Banu Shayban tribesmen, through Mosul and central Iraq, defeating Umayyad forces at Nahrawan and Khanaqin before attacking Kufa with 200 of his fighters. Afterwards, in March 696, he won battles against the Umayyad generals Za'ida ibn Qudama and Uthman ibn Qatan al-Harithi at the villages of Rudhbar and al-Batt, both located along the southern edge of the Mosul plains. In mid-696, after three months of back-and-forth fighting, Shabib and 600 of his men took over al-Mada'in in central Iraq, defeating Attab ibn Warqa al-Riyahi. At this point, the Kharijites threatened Kufa, one of the main garrison centres of Iraq. However, a thousands-strong Syrian army under Sufyan ibn al-Abrad al-Kalbi was deployed and decisively defeated Shabib outside the city. Shabib withdrew and fought a skirmish in Anbar, before proceeding with the remainder of his men through Jukha, Kirman and Ahwaz. As he attempted to escape his Syrian pursuers, he drowned in the Dujayl Canal while trying to cross it. This occurred in 697 or 698, depending on the source.

== Legacy ==
Shabib's son, Suhari, later launched a rebellion against the Umayyad governor of Iraq, Khalid al-Qasri, in 737 and Kharijite risings in Upper Mesopotamia and the environs of Mosul continued intermittently throughout the Umayyad and early Abbasid periods.

== Bibliography ==
- Rowson, Everett K., ed. (1989). The History of al-Ṭabarī, Volume XXII: The Marwānid Restoration: The Caliphate of ʿAbd al-Malik, A.D. 693–701/A.H. 74–81. SUNY Series in Near Eastern Studies. Albany, New York: State University of New York Press. ISBN 978-0-88706-975-8.
- Zetterstéen, K. V. (1997). "Shabīb ibn Yazīd". In Bosworth, C. E.; van Donzel, E.; Heinrichs, W. P. & Lecomte, G. (eds.). The Encyclopaedia of Islam, Second Edition. Volume IX: San–Sze. Leiden: E. J. Brill. pp. 164–165. ISBN 978-90-04-10422-8.
