= Ghazala =

Leader of the Kharijite movement

- غزالة
- Born: Mosul
- Spouse: Shabib ibn Yazid al-Shaybani

Ghazāla (Arabic: غزالة زوجة شبيب; died 696 AD near Kufa) was a leader of the Kharijite movement.

== Biography ==
Ghazāla, born in Mosul, was the wife of Shabib ibn Yazid al-Shaybani. Shabib rebelled against Umayyad rule, and Ghazala was actively at his side. She commanded troops, following in the footsteps of previous Muslim women like Juwayriyya bint al-Ḥārith at the Battle of Yarmuk.

In one battle, she made the Umayyad governor Hajjāj ibn-Yūsuf flee, and take refuge in his palace in Kufa. As a result, a poem was composed shaming him for posterity:

You are a lion against me, but in the battle an ostrich which spreads its wings and hurries off on hearing the chirping of a sparrow. Why did you not go forth in the conflict and fight with Ghazala hand to hand? But no! Your heart fled from you (as if) with the wings of a bird.

In 696 AD (77 AH), after having controlled the city of Kufa for a day, Ghazāla led her male warriors in prayer as well as recited two of the longest chapters from the Quran during the prayer in the Mosque.

She was killed in battle, and her head was cut off for presenting it to Hajjaj. However, her husband Shabib sent a horseman who killed the carrier of his wife's head, and had a proper burial for it.
