= Dujayl Canal =

Medieval irrigation canal in Iraq

The Dujayl Canal was a medieval irrigation canal providing water to Baghdad. Originally it brought water from the Euphrates, but by the end of the 10th century its connection to that river had silted up, and a new connection was dug to the Tigris river.

== Sources ==
- Le Strange, Guy (1905). The Lands of the Eastern Caliphate: Mesopotamia, Persia, and Central Asia, from the Moslem Conquest to the Time of Timur. New York: Barnes & Noble, Inc. OCLC 1044046., pp. 51, 65, 80, 85
