= Islamic views on piety =

Piety in Islam is one of the most important Islamic ethics. It is called commonly by Muslims as taqwa.

== In the Quran ==
In the Quran piety is defined as:

2:177 True piety does not consist in turning your faces towards the east or the west - but truly pious is he who believes in God, and the Last Day; and the angels, and revelation, and the prophets; and spends his substance - however much he himself may cherish it - upon his near of kin, and the orphans, and the needy, and the wayfarer, and the beggars, and for the freeing of human beings from bondage; and is constant in prayer, and renders the purifying dues; and [truly pious are] they who keep their promises whenever they promise, and are patient in misfortune and hardship and in time of peril: it is they that have proved themselves true, and it is they, they who are conscious of God.

— "Quran" (PDF). Archived from the original (PDF) on 2015-09-19.

== In the Hadith ==
Piety is defined in the hadith, a collection of Muhammad's sayings. It is reported by An-Nawwas bin Sam'an:

"The Prophet Muhammad said, "Piety is good manner, and sin is that which creates doubt and which you do not like people to know it."

— Sahih Muslim, 32:6195,Sahih Muslim, 32:6196

Wabisah bin Ma’bad reported:

"I went to Messenger of Allah and he asked me: "Have you come to inquire about piety?" I replied in the affirmative. Then he said: "Ask your heart regarding it. Piety is that which contents the soul and comforts the heart, and sin is that which causes doubts and perturbs the heart, even if people pronounce it lawful and give you verdicts on such matters again and again."

— Ahmad and Ad-Darmi

== See also ==
- Islamic views on sin
