= Azariqa =

Sub-sect within the Kharijite Movement

The Azariqa (Arabic: الأزارقة, romanized: al-ʾAzāriqa) were an extremist branch of the Kharijites who followed the leadership of Nafi ibn al-Azraq. Adherents of Azraqism participated in an armed struggle against the rulers of the Umayyad Caliphate, and they declared those who avoided this duty infidels (kafirs) and allowed their murder. Nafi ibn al-Azraq even permitted the killing of women and children of his opponents. At the same time, the Azraqites did not extend the principle of killing "apostates" to Christians and Jews, since they believed that they did not betray the teachings of the prophets Jesus and Moses.

In terms of law, the Azariqa, like the Haruriyya, rejected the hadith. Like all Kharijites, they declared Muslims who committed great sins (al-Kabā'ir) to be unfaithful, and claimed that they would eternally suffer in hellfire. The Azraqites denied the principle of "prudent concealment of faith" (takiya). They recognized the imamate as "worthy" (أفضل ʾafḍal), that is, the applicant who would come up with arms and call people to fight "unbelievers" and would not allow the imamate to be "surpassed" (مفضول mafḍūl). Based on this, they declared the caliph Ali ibn Abu Talib, Uthman ibn Affan and their adherents unbelievers. The Azraqites considered the territories beyond their control to be the "land of war" (دار الحرب Dār al-Ḥarb).

== History ==
The Kharijites originated at the Battle of Siffin in 657 when they opposed the arbitration agreement between the belligerents Caliph Ali and the Syrian governor Mu'awiya. Opposing both parties, they seceded from Ali's army, whose part they initially had been, and established their own small state in Iraq. They were attacked and crushed by the caliph. The surviving Kharijites fled and one of them assassinated Ali in 661, after which Mu'awiya became caliph. The Kharijite rebellions against his government were defeated, but after his death in 680, when civil war broke out, the Kharijites resumed their anti-state activism.

Iraqi garrison town of Basra had become the center of the Kharijite activity. In 683, several Basran Kharijites went to the Islamic holy city of Mecca to help Abd Allah ibn al-Zubayr, an opponent of the new caliph Yazid I, who had been besieged in the city. After the death of Yazid later that year, the Kharijites broke up with Ibn al-Zubayr due to difference of opinion and went back to Basra where chaos reigned in the aftermath of the caliph's death. One of these was Nafi ibn al-Azraq. Ibn al-Azraq along with other militant Kharijites took over the city, killed the deputy governor and broke 140 Kharijites free from prison. Soon afterwards, the Basrans recognized Ibn al-Zubayr as caliph and he appointed Umar ibn Ubayd Allah ibn Ma'mar his governor there. Umar drove the band of Ibn al-Azraq out of Basra and they escaped to Ahwaz.

From the Ahwaz area, Ibn al-Azraq, the eponym of the sect, raided Basran suburbs. These are described in the sources to be the most fanatic of all the Kharijite groups for they approved of the doctrine of isti'rad: indiscriminate killing of the non-Kharijite Muslims including their women and children. An army sent against them by the Zubayrid governor of Basra in early 685 defeated the Azariqa and Ibn al-Azraq was killed. However, they chose Ubayd Allah ibn Mahuz as the new Emir, regrouped and forced the Zubayrid army to retreat and ransacking resumed. After a few more defeats, Ibn al-Zubayr sent Muhallab ibn Abi Sufra against them. Muhallab defeated them at the battle of Sillabra in May 686 and killed Ibn Mahuz. They subsequently retreated to Fars. However, in late 686, Muhallab had to discontinue his campaign against the Azariqa as he was sent against the pro-Alid Mukhtar and later appointed governor of Mosul to defend against possible Umayyad attack. The Azariqa, now under the command of Ubayd Allah ibn Mahuz's brother Zubayr, returned to Iraq and attacked al-Mada'in, in the neighborhood of Kufa, ravaged the town and after pursuit fled again to Iran where they besieged Isfahan. They were driven away and, Zubayr ibn Mahuz being slain, fled to Fars and latter to Kirman. Reinvigorated by their new leader Qatari ibn al-Fuja'a, the Azariqa returned to Basra area soon afterwards and Muhallab had to be sent against them. For a long time, the Azariqa held Fars and Kirman although Muhallab prevented them from advancing to Iraq. Qatari minted his own coins in the regions under his control and adopted the title amir al-mu'minin (commander of the faithful), which was reserved for caliphs. In the meantime, Umayyads recaptured Iraq from the Zubayrids in 691. Umayyad princes took over the command from Muhallab but suffered severe defeats at the hands of the Azariqa. In 694 Hajjaj ibn Yusuf, a Thaqafite, was made governor of Iraq and he reinstated Muhallab to lead the fight against the Azariqa. After a series of attacks, he pushed them back into Kirman. There they split into two groups and were subsequently destroyed in 698–699.

== See also ==
- Kharijites
- Kharijite Rebellions against Ali

== Sources ==
- Gaiser, Adam (2020). "Khārijīs". In Fleet, Kate; Krämer, Gudrun; Matringe, Denis; Nawas, John; Rowson, Everett (eds.). Encyclopaedia of Islam (3rd ed.). Brill Online. doi:10.1163/1573-3912_ei3_COM_35487. ISSN 1873-9830.
- Lewinstein, Keith (2008). "Azāriqa". In Fleet, Kate; Krämer, Gudrun; Matringe, Denis; Nawas, John; Rowson, Everett (eds.). Encyclopaedia of Islam (3rd ed.). Brill Online. doi:10.1163/1573-3912_ei3_COM_0171. ISSN 1873-9830.
- Rubinacci, R. (1960). "Azāriḳa". In Bosworth, C. E.; van Donzel, E. J.; Heinrichs, W. P.; Lewis, B.; Pellat, Ch.; Schacht, J. (eds.). Encyclopaedia of Islam, Second Edition. Vol. 1. Leiden and Boston: Brill Publishers. pp. 810–811. doi:10.1163/1573-3912_islam_SIM_0944. ISBN 978-90-04-16121-4. OCLC 495469456.
- Wellhausen, Julius (1901). Die religiös-politischen Oppositionsparteien im alten Islam (in German). Berlin: Weidmannsche buchhandlung. OCLC 453206240.
