= Kharijites =

Early Islamic rebellious sect

The Kharijites (Arabic: الخوارج, romanized: al-Khawārij, singular Arabic: خارجي, romanized: khārijī) were an Islamic sect which emerged during the First Fitna (656–661). The first Kharijites were supporters of Ali who rebelled against his acceptance of arbitration talks to settle the conflict with his challenger, Mu'awiya, at the Battle of Siffin in 657. They asserted that "judgment belongs to God alone", which became their motto, and that rebels such as Mu'awiya had to be fought and overcome according to Qur'anic injunctions. Ali defeated the Kharijites at the Battle of Nahrawan in 658, but their insurrection continued. Ali was assassinated in 661 by a Kharijite dissident seeking revenge for the defeat at Nahrawan.

After Mu'awiya established the Umayyad Caliphate in 661, his governors kept the Kharijites in check. The power vacuum caused by the Second Fitna (680–692) allowed for the resumption of the Kharijites' anti-government rebellion, and the Kharijite factions of the Azariqa and Najdat came to control large areas in Persia and Arabia. Internal disputes and fragmentation weakened them considerably before their defeat by the Umayyads in 696–699. In the 740s, large-scale Kharijite rebellions broke out across the caliphate, but all were eventually suppressed. Although the Kharijite revolts continued into the Abbasid Caliphate (750-1258), including a major rebellion from 866 to 896, the most militant Kharijite groups were gradually eliminated. They were replaced by the non-activist Ibadiyya, who survive to this day in Oman and some parts of North Africa. They, however, deny any links with the Kharijites of the Second Muslim Civil War and beyond, condemning them as extremists.

The Kharijites did not have a uniform set of doctrines. The Kharijites believed that any Muslim, irrespective of his descent or ethnicity, qualified for the role of caliph, provided that he was morally irreproachable. It was the duty of Muslims to rebel against and depose caliphs who sinned. Most Kharijite groups branded as disbelievers (kuffar; sing. kafir) Muslims who had committed a grave sin, and the most militant declared killing of such unbelievers to be licit, unless they repented. Many Kharijites were skilled orators and poets, and the major themes of their poetry were piety and martyrdom. The Kharijites of the eighth and ninth centuries participated in theological debates and, in the process, contributed to mainstream Islamic theology.

What is known about Kharijite history and doctrines derives from non-Kharijite authors of the ninth and tenth centuries and is hostile toward the sect. The absence of the Kharijite version of their history has made unearthing their true motives difficult. Traditional Muslim historical sources and mainstream Muslims viewed the Kharijites as religious extremists who left the Muslim community. The term Kharijites is often used by modern mainstream Muslims to describe Islamist extremist groups that have been compared to the Kharijites for their radical ideology and militancy. On the other hand, some modern Arab historians have stressed the egalitarian and proto-democratic tendencies of the Kharijites. Modern, academic historians are generally divided in attributing the Kharijite phenomenon to purely religious motivations, economic factors, or a Bedouin i.e. nomadic challenge to the establishment of an organized state, with some rejecting the traditional account of the movement having started at Siffin.

== Etymology ==
The term al-Khariji was used as an exonym by their opponents for leaving the army of Caliph Ali during the First Fitna. The term comes from the Arabic root خ ر ج, which has the primary meaning "to leave" or "to get out", as in the basic word خرج, ḵẖaraja, "to go out". The term Khawarij is anglicized to 'Kharijites' from the singular Khariji. They called themselves al-Shurat ("the Exchangers"), which they understood within the context of Islamic scripture (Quran 2:207) and philosophy to mean "those who have traded the mortal life (al-Dunya) for the other life [with God] (al-Akhirah)".

== Primary and classical sources ==
Almost no primary Kharijite sources survive, except for works by authors from the sole surviving Kharijite sect of Ibadiyya, and excerpts in non-Kharijite works. As the latter are the main sources of information and date to later periods, the Kharijite material has suffered alterations and distortions during transmission, collection, and classification.

Non-Kharijite sources fall mainly into two categories: histories and heresiographical works—the so-called firaq (sects) literature. The histories were written significantly later than the actual events, and many of the theological and political disputes among the early Muslims had been settled by then. As representatives of the emerging orthodoxy, the Sunni as well as Shia authors of these works looked upon the original events through the lens of this orthodox viewpoint. The bulk of information regarding the Kharijites, however, comes from the second category. These sources are outright polemical, as the authors tend to portray their own sect as the true representative of original Islam and are consequently hostile to the Kharijites. Although the authors in both categories used earlier Kharijite as well as non-Kharijite sources, which are no longer extant, their rendering of the events has been heavily altered by literary topoi. (Note: Many reports of the Kharijite revolts, for example, follow a distinct pattern: the gathering of the Kharijites; appointment of a leader who reluctantly accepts the appointment after having flatly refused at first; a moving sermon by the leader emphasizing the desire to fight for God; and finally the revolt. Others include extreme piety, desire for holy war and martyrdom, and extreme violence.)

Based on a hadith (saying or tradition attributed to the Islamic prophet Muhammad) prophesying the emergence of 73 sects in Islam, of which one would be saved (al-firqa al-najiya) and the rest doomed as deviant, the heresiographers were mainly concerned with classifying what they considered to be deviant sects and their heretical doctrines. Consequently, views of certain sects were altered to fit into classification schemes, and sometimes fictitious sects were invented. Moreover, the reports are often confused and contradictory, rendering a reconstruction of 'what actually happened' and the true motives of the Kharijites, which is free of later interpolations, especially difficult. According to the historians Hannah-Lena Hagemann and Peter Verkinderen, the sources sometimes used the Kharijites as a literary tool to address other issues, which were otherwise unrelated to the Kharijites, such as "the status of Ali, the dangers of communal strife, or the legal aspects of rebellion". The Ibadi sources, on the other hand, are hagiographical and are concerned with preserving the group identity. Toward this purpose, stories are sometimes created, or real events altered, in order to romanticize and valorize early Kharijite revolts and their leaders as the anchors of the group identity. These too are hostile to other Kharijite groups. The sources, whether Ibadi, historiographical, or heresiographical, do not necessarily report events as they actually happened. They rather show how their respective authors viewed, and wanted their readers to view, these events.

The sources in the historiographical category include the History of al-Tabari (d. 923), Ansab al-Ashraf of al-Baladhuri (d. 892), (Note: Al-Baladhuri is somewhat sympathetic towards the Kharijites as he is more concerned with depicting the Umayyads as tyrants, whose tyranny he contrasts with Kharijite piety. Al-Tabari, in contrast, focuses on condemnation of militant Kharijites.) al-Kamil of al-Mubarrad (d. 899), and Muruj al-Dhahab of al-Mas'udi (d. 956). Other notable sources include the histories of Ibn Athir (d. 1233), and Ibn Kathir (d. 1373), but these have drawn most of their material from al-Tabari. The core of the information in these historiographical sources is based on the works of earlier historians like Abu Mikhnaf (d. 773), Abu Ubayda (d. 825), and al-Mada'ini (d. 843). The authors of the heresiographical category include al-Ash'ari (d. 935), (Note: Kitab Maqalat al-Islamiyyin wa Ikhtilaf al-Musallin.) al-Baghdadi (d. 1037), (Note: Al-farq bayn al-firaq.) Ibn Hazm (d. 1064), (Note: Kitab al-Fasl fi'l-Milal wa'l-Ahwa wa'l-Nihal.) al-Shahrastani (d. 1153), (Note: Kitab al-Milal wa'l-Nihal.) and others. Notable among the surviving Ibadi works is the eighth-century heresiographical writing of Salim ibn Dhakwan. It distinguishes Ibadism from other Kharijite groups which it treats as extremists. Al-Kashf wa'l-Bayan, a 12th-century work by al-Qalhati, is another example of Ibadi heresiographies and discusses the origins of the Kharijites and the divisions within the Kharijite movement.

== Origins ==
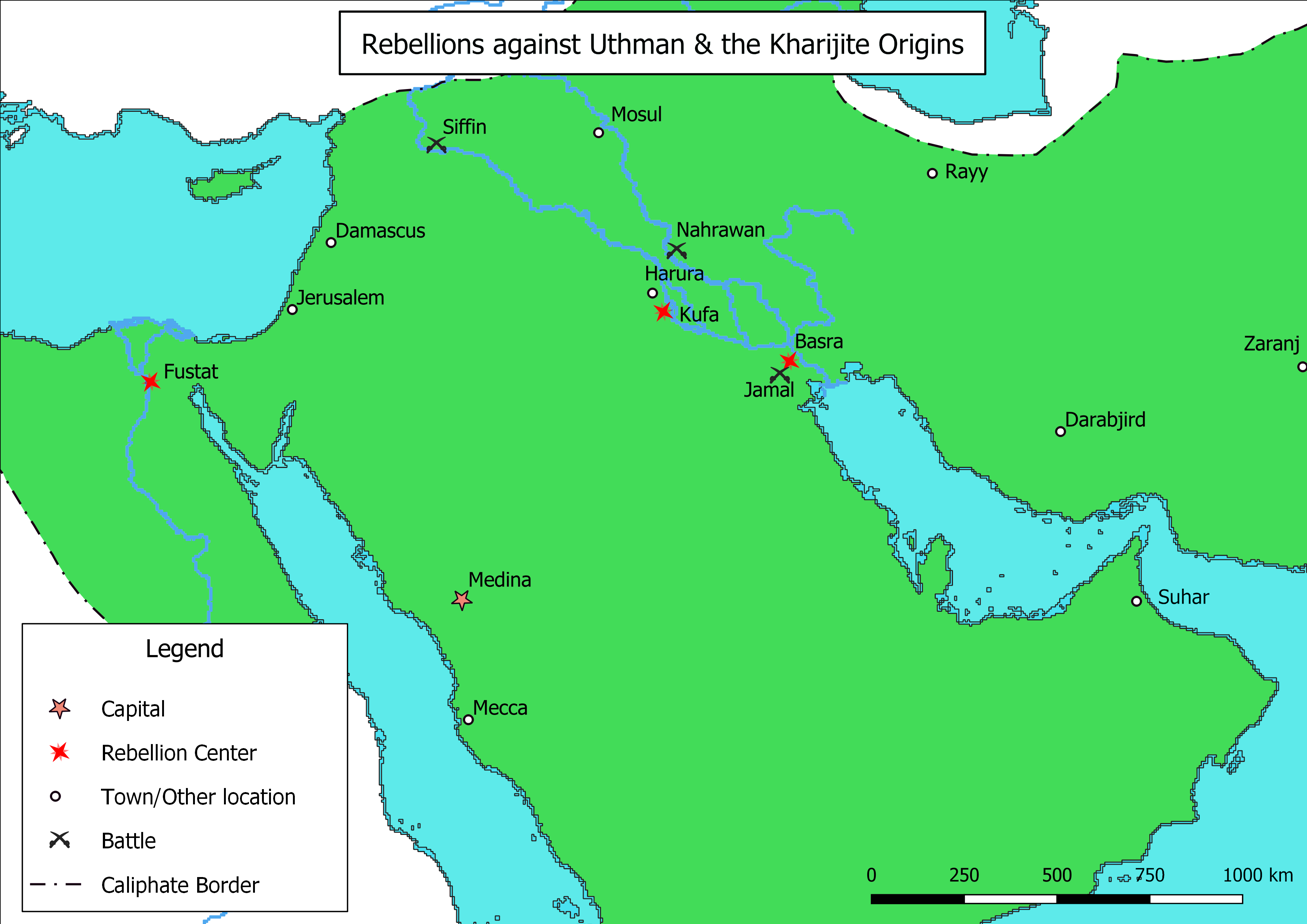
Rebellions in the garrison towns of Kufa, Basra, and Fustat ended with the death of the third caliph Uthman. The subsequent First Fitna gave rise to the Kharijites.

=== Emergence during the First Fitna ===
The Kharijites were the first sect to arise within Islam. They originated during the First Fitna, the struggle for political leadership over the Muslim community (ummah), following the 656 assassination of the third caliph Uthman (r. 644–656).

The later years of Uthman's reign were marked by growing discontent from multiple groups within the Muslim community. His favoritism and enrichment of his Umayyad relatives was disdained by the Muslim elite in Medina. (Note: He appointed his kinsmen to all important governorships and made monetary and land grants to his close relatives.) The early Muslim settlers of the garrison towns of Kufa and Fustat, in the conquered regions of Iraq and Egypt, felt their status threatened by several factors during this period. These were Uthman's interference in provincial affairs, (Note: He demanded that the surplus revenue from the provinces be sent to Medina. He also asserted that the conquered agricultural lands in Iraq, which the second caliph Umar had declared state assets from whose revenue the fighters were paid, were state property which he, as the Caliph, could use at his discretion.) overcrowding of the garrison towns by a continuous tribal influx from Arabia, diminishing revenue from the conquests, and the growing influence of the pre-Islamic tribal nobility. Opposition by the Iraqi early-comers, who became known as the qurra (which probably means 'the Qur'an reciters'), and the Egyptians turned into open rebellion in 656. Encouraged by the disaffected Medinese elite, the rebels marched on Medina, killing Uthman in June 656. His murder sparked the civil war.

Afterward, Muhammad's cousin and son-in-law Ali became caliph with the help of the people of Medina and the rebels. He was soon challenged by Muhammad's widow, Aisha, and Muhammad's early companions, Talha ibn Ubayd Allah and Zubayr ibn al-Awwam, who held that his election was invalid as it involved Uthman's murderers and hence a shura (consultative assembly) had to be called to elect a new caliph. Ali defeated them in November 656 at the Battle of the Camel. Later, Mu'awiya ibn Abi Sufyan, Uthman's kinsman and the governor of Syria, denounced Ali's election, holding that Uthman's murderers were in Ali's camp and evaded punishment. The two faced each other at the Battle of Siffin in July 657. On the verge of defeat, Mu'awiya ordered his soldiers to hoist leaves of the Qur'an (masahif) on their lances, a signal to stop the fight and negotiate peace. The qurra in Ali's army were moved by the gesture, which they interpreted as an appeal to the Book of God, and demanded that Ali halt the fighting immediately. Although initially unwilling, he yielded under pressure and threats of violence against him by the qurra. An arbitration committee composed of representatives of Ali and Mu'awiya was established with a mandate to settle the dispute according to the Qur'an and the sunna. (Note: The arbitration document did not state clearly what issue was to be settled. It is also unclear what the term al-sunna al-adila (lit. 'the just practice') meant. It may have meant the generally accepted practice of conduct, or the practice of Muhammad. A later spurious version of the document revised the term to meaning the sunna of Muhammad. The Kharijites opposed this because it implied the Qur'an was not a sufficient basis to make the judgment.) While most of Ali's army accepted the agreement, one group, which included many Tamim tribesmen, vehemently objected to the arbitration and raised the slogan 'judgment belongs to God alone' (la hukma illa li-llah).

==== Harura ====
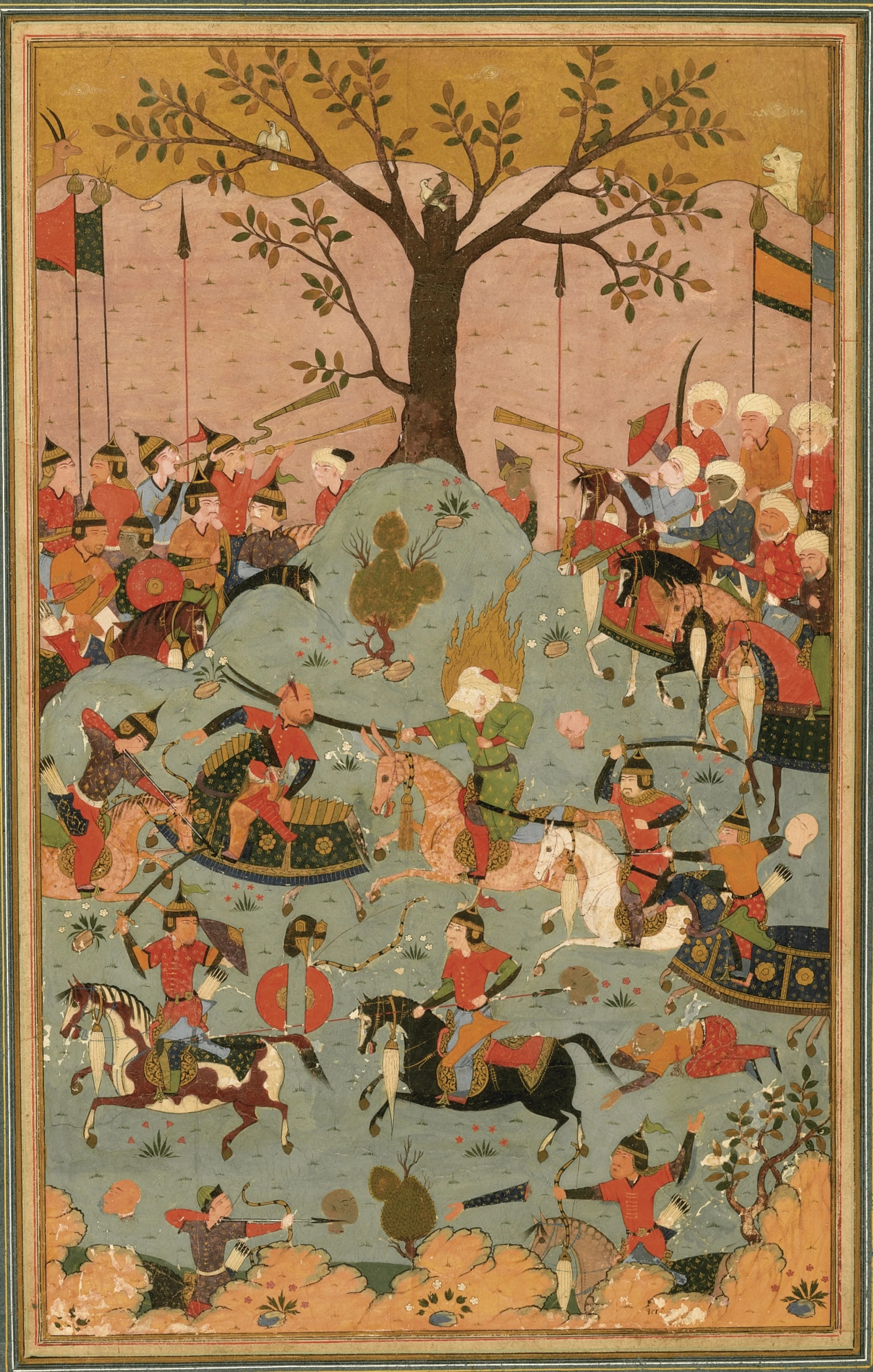
Persian miniature, likely depicting Ali at the Battle of Siffin, created in Safavid Iran, dated 1516

As Ali marched back to his capital at Kufa, widespread resentment toward the arbitration developed in his army. As many as 12,000 dissenters (Note: This figure is from al-Baghdadi. Al-Mubarrad reports 2,000, whereas al-Qalhati 10,000.) seceded from the army and set up camp in Harura, a place near Kufa. They thus became known as the Harurites. They held that Uthman had deserved his death because of his nepotism and not ruling according to the Qur'an, and that Ali was the legitimate caliph, while Mu'awiya was a rebel. They believed that the Qur'an clearly stated that as a rebel Mu'awiya was not entitled to arbitration, but rather should be fought until he repented, pointing to the Qur'anic verse:

And if two groups of believers fight each other, then make peace between them. But if one of them transgresses against the other, then fight against the transgressing group until they ˹are willing to˺ submit to the rule of Allah. If they do so, then make peace between both ˹groups˺ in all fairness and act justly. Surely Allah loves those who uphold justice.

— Surah Al-Hujurat 49:9

They held that in agreeing to arbitration, Ali committed the grave sin of rejecting God's judgment (hukm) and attempted to substitute human judgment for God's clear injunction, which prompted their motto 'judgment belongs to God alone'. From this expression, which they were the first to adopt as a motto, they became known as the Muhakkima.

Ali visited the Harura camp and attempted to regain the dissidents' support, arguing that it was they who had forced him to accept the arbitration proposal despite his reservations. They acknowledged that they had sinned but insisted that they repented and asked him to do the same, which Ali then did in general and ambiguous terms. The troops at Harura subsequently restored their allegiance to Ali and returned to Kufa, on the condition that the war against Mu'awiya be resumed within six months.

==== Nahrawan ====
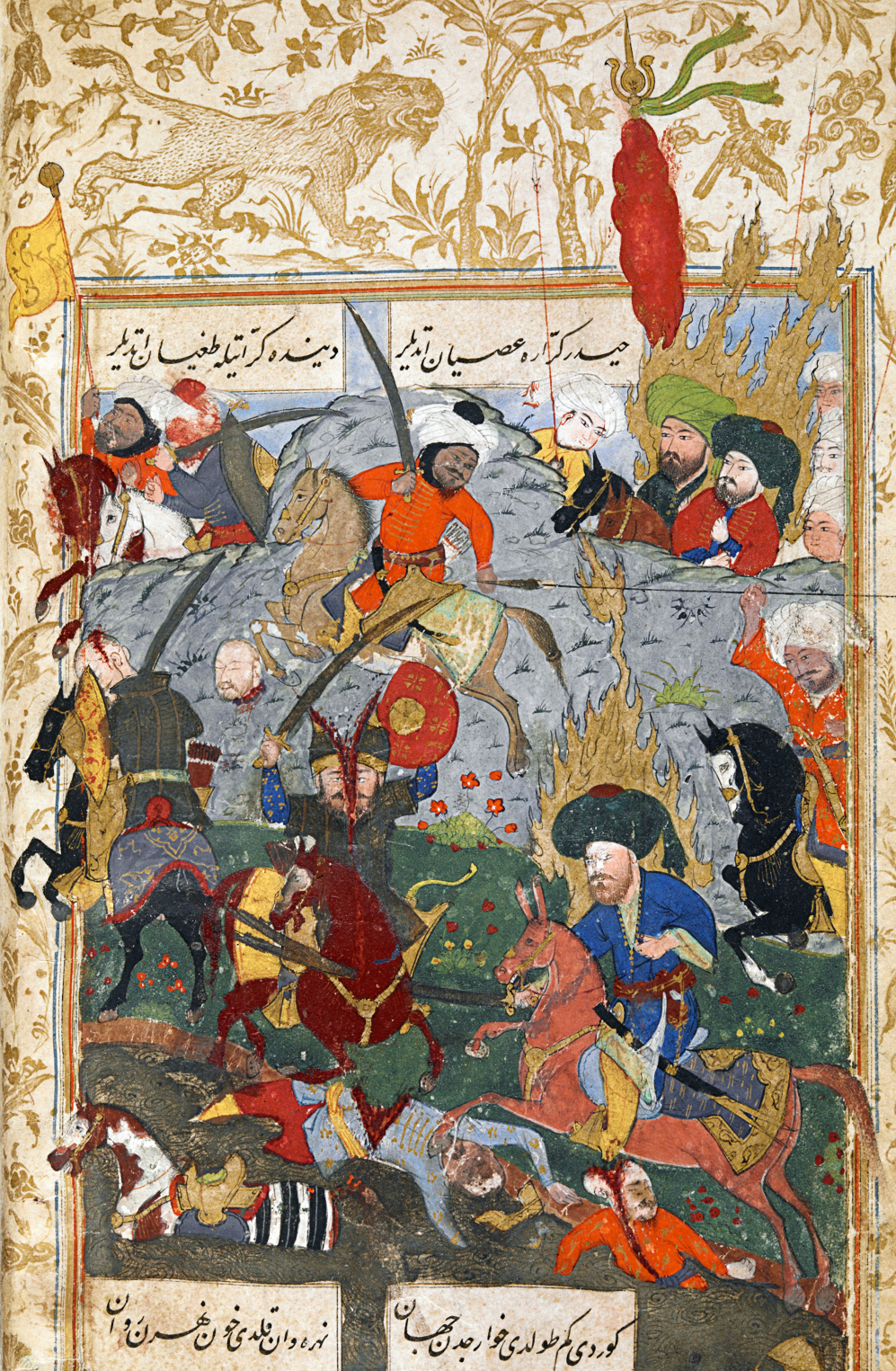
The Battle of Nahrawan; an Ottoman miniature painting from 16th/17th century

Ali refused to denounce the arbitration proceedings, which continued despite the reconciliation with the troops at Harura. In March 658, Ali sent a delegation, led by Abu Musa al-Ash'ari, to carry out the talks. The troops opposed to the arbitration thereafter condemned Ali's rule and elected the pious Abd Allah ibn Wahb al-Rasibi as their caliph. In order to evade detection, they moved out of Kufa in small groups and went to a place called Nahrawan on the east bank of the Tigris. Some five hundred of their Basran comrades were informed and joined them in Nahrawan, numbering reportedly up to 4,000 men. They declared Ali and his followers as unbelievers, and are held to have killed several people who did not share their views.

In the meantime, the arbitrators declared that Uthman had been killed unjustly by the rebels. They could not agree on any other substantive matters and the process collapsed. Ali denounced the conduct of Abu Musa and Mu'awiya's lead arbitrator Amr ibn al-As as contrary to the Qur'an and the sunna, and rallied his supporters for a renewed war against Mu'awiya. He invited the Kharijites to join him as before. They refused, pending his acknowledgement of having gone astray and his repentance. Seeing no chance of reconciliation, Ali decided to depart for Syria without them. On the way, however, he received news of the Kharijites' murder of a traveler, which was then followed by the murder of his envoy, who had been sent to investigate. (Note: The traveler is said to have been Abd Allah, a son of Muhammad's companion Khabbab. The story, in multiple variants, is found in almost every source dealing with the early Kharijites. In the most famous version, Ibn Khabbab encounters a group of Kharijites. In response to their questions, he narrates a hadith of Muhammad prophesying the emergence of fitna (literally trial or seduction, but historically civil war) and instructing the believers to be among the 'killed' rather than the 'killers'. Outraged, the Kharijites take him captive. One of them spits out a date, that he had found on the way, when objected by others that he had picked it without the permission of the owner. Later, he finds and pays the owner of a pig he had just killed without permission. Ibn Khabbab erroneously concludes that a people with such scruples would not kill him. He is slaughtered on top of the pig carcass; his pregnant slave girl is also killed and her womb ripped open. Historians Adam Gaiser and Hannah-Lena Hagemann hold that the story, due to its prevalence in the sources, likely has a kernel of truth, but has been heavily modified for variety of purposes and the details are unreliable. It contrasts the extreme piety of the Kharijites with extreme violence perpetrated by them to stress the hollowness of their religiosity, emphasize dangers associated with religious extremism, and justify Ali's attack on them at Nahrawan. Certain versions of the story have anachronous references to isti'rad, whereas overall structure is similar to an incident of a later date. It also mimics the actions characteristic of the later Azariqa group. What can be said with some degree of certainty is that Ibn Khabbab was killed by some of the Kharijites, for unknown reasons, and that the rest refused to hand these over to Ali at Nahrawan.) He was urged by his followers, who feared for their families and property in Kufa, to deal with the Kharijites first. After the Kharijites refused to surrender the murderers, Ali's men attacked their camp, inflicting a heavy defeat on them at the Battle of Nahrawan (July 658), in which al-Rasibi and most of his supporters were slain. Around 1,200 Kharijites surrendered and were spared. The bloodshed sealed the split of the Kharijites from Ali's followers, and they continued to launch insurrections against the caliphate. Five small Kharijite revolts following Nahrawan, involving about 200 men each, were suppressed during Ali's rule. The Kharijite calls for revenge ultimately led to Ali's assassination by the Kharijite dissident Ibn Muljim. The latter killed Ali with a poisoned sword while Ali was leading morning prayers on 26 January 661 in the Great Mosque of Kufa.

== Later history ==
=== Under Mu'awiya ===
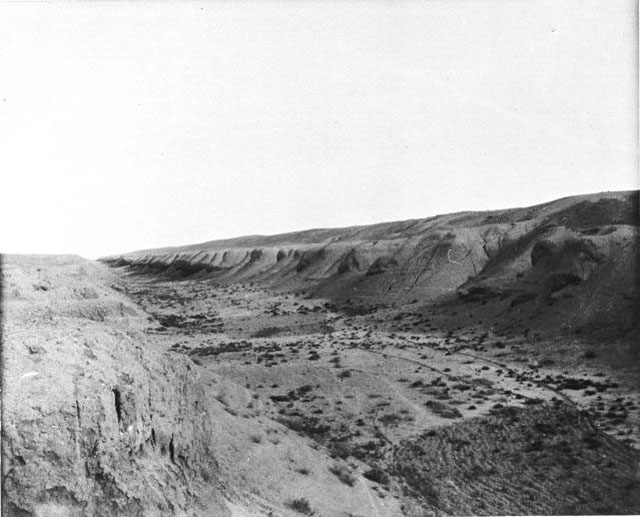
A 1909 photograph of the Nahrawan Canal

The accession of Mu'awiya, the original enemy of the Kharijites, to the caliphate in August 661 provided the new impetus for Kharijite rebellion. Those Kharijites at Nahrawan who had been unwilling to fight Ali and had left the battlefield, rebelled against Mu'awiya. Under the leadership of Farwa ibn Nawfal al-Ashja'i of the Banu Murra, some 500 of them attacked Mu'awiya's camp at Nukhayla (a place outside Kufa) where he was taking the Kufans' oath of allegiance. In the ensuing battle, the Kharijites repelled the initial sortie by Mu'awiya's troops, but were eventually defeated and most of them killed. Seven more Kufan Kharijite uprisings, with rebel numbers in individual revolts varying between 20 and 400, were defeated by the governor al-Mughira ibn Shu'ba. The best known of these revolts was that of al-Mustawrid ibn Ullafa, who was recognized as caliph by the Kufan Kharijites in 663. With about 300 followers, he left Kufa and moved to Behrasir. There, he confronted the deputy governor Simak ibn Ubayd al-Absi and invited him to denounce Uthman and Ali "who had made innovations in the religion and denied the holy book". Simak refused and al-Mustawrid, instead of engaging him directly, decided to exhaust and fragment Simak's forces by forcing them into pursuit. Moving onto Madhar near Basra, al-Mustawrid was overtaken by a 300-strong advance party of Simak's forces. Although al-Mustawrid was able to withstand this small force, he fled again toward Kufa when the main body of Simak's forces, under the command of Ma'qil ibn Qays, arrived. Eluding Ma'qil's advance guard of 600 men, al-Mustawrid led a surprise attack on Ma'qil's main force, destroying it. The advance guard returned in the meantime and attacked the Kharijites from the rear. Nearly all of them were slain.

Kufan Kharijism died out around 663, (Note: An isolated revolt of the surviving followers of Mustawrid occurred in 678 and was easily put down.) and Basra became the center of Kharijite disturbances. Ziyad ibn Abihi and his son Ubayd Allah ibn Ziyad, who successively became governors of Iraq, dealt harshly with the Kharijites, and five Kharijite revolts, usually involving around 70 men, were suppressed. Notable among these was that of the cousins Qarib ibn Murra al-Azdi and Zuhhaff ibn Zahr al-Tayyi. In 672/673, they rebelled in Basra with a 70-strong band. They are reported to have been involved in the random killing (isti'rad) of people in the streets and mosques of Basra before being cornered in a house, where they were eventually killed and their bodies crucified. Afterward, Ziyad is reported to have severely persecuted their followers. Ibn Ziyad jailed any Kharijite whom he suspected of being dangerous and executed several Kharijite sympathizers who had publicly denounced him. Between their successive reigns, Ziyad and his son are said to have killed 13,000 Kharijites. As a result of these repressive measures, some of the Kharijites abandoned military action, adopting political quietism and concealing their religious beliefs. Of the quietists, the best known was Abu Bilal Mirdas ibn Udayya al-Tamimi. One of the earliest Kharijites who had seceded at Siffin, he was held in the highest esteem by the Basran quietists. Provoked by the torture and murder of a Kharijite woman by Ibn Ziyad, Abu Bilal abandoned Basra and revolted in 680/681 with 40 men. Shortly after defeating a 2,000-strong Basran force in Ahwaz, he fell to a larger army of 3,000 or 4,000 in Fars in southern Persia. His fate is said to have aroused the quietists and contributed to the increased Kharijite militancy in the subsequent period.

=== Second Fitna ===
During the Second Fitna, the Najdat controlled Yamama in central Arabia, whereas the Azariqa controlled Fars and Kirman in southern Persia.

After the death of Mu'awiya in 680, civil war ensued over leadership of the Muslim community. The people of the Hejaz (where Mecca and Medina are located) rebelled against Mu'awiya's son and successor, Yazid. The Mecca-based Abd Allah ibn al-Zubayr, a son of Zubayr ibn al-Awwam, was the most prominent Hejazi opponent of Yazid. When Yazid sent an army to suppress the rebellion in 683 and Mecca was besieged, Kharijites from Basra reinforced Ibn al-Zubayr. After Yazid's death in November, Ibn al-Zubayr proclaimed himself caliph and publicly condemned Uthman's murder. Both acts prompted the Kharijites to abandon his cause. The majority, including Nafi ibn al-Azraq and Najda ibn Amir al-Hanafi, went to Basra, while the remainder left for the Yamama, in central Arabia, under the leadership of Abu Talut Salim ibn Matar. In the meantime, Ibn Ziyad was expelled by tribal chiefs in Basra, where inter-tribal strife ensued. Ibn al-Azraq and other militant Kharijites took over the city, killed the deputy left by Ibn Ziyad and freed 140 Kharijites from prison. Soon afterwards, the Basrans recognized Ibn al-Zubayr, who appointed Umar ibn Ubayd Allah ibn Ma'mar as the city's governor. Umar drove out Ibn al-Azraq's men from Basra and they escaped to Ahwaz.

==== Azariqa ====
From Ahwaz, Ibn al-Azraq raided Basra's suburbs. His followers are called Azariqa after their leader, and are described in the sources as the most fanatic of the Kharijite groups, for they approved the doctrine of isti'rad: indiscriminate killing of the non-Kharijite Muslims, including their women and children. An army sent against them by the Zubayrid governor of Basra in early 685 defeated the Azariqa, and Ibn al-Azraq was killed. The Azariqa chose Ubayd Allah ibn Mahuz as their new leader, regrouped, forced the Zubayrid army to retreat, and resumed their raids. After more defeats, Ibn al-Zubayr deployed his most able commander, Al-Muhallab ibn Abi Sufra, against the Azariqa. Al-Muhallab defeated them at the battle of Sillabra in May 686 and killed Ibn Mahuz. The Azariqa retreated to Fars. In late 686, al-Muhallab discontinued his campaign as he was sent to rein in the pro-Alid ruler of Kufa, Mukhtar al-Thaqafi, and was afterwards appointed governor of Mosul to defend against possible Umayyad attacks from Syria. The Azariqa plundered al-Mada'in and then besieged Isfahan, but were defeated. They fled and eventually regrouped in Kirman. Reinvigorated by a new leader, Qatari ibn al-Fuja'a, the Azariqa attacked Basra's environs afterward and al-Muhallab was redeployed to suppress them. Although the Azariqa were not dislodged from Fars and Kirman, al-Muhallab prevented their advance into Iraq. Qatari minted his own coins and adopted the caliphal title amir al-mu'minin (commander of the faithful). After the Umayyads reconquered Iraq from the Zubayrids in 691, Umayyad princes took over the command from al-Muhallab, but were dealt severe defeats by the Azariqa. In 694 the commander Hajjaj ibn Yusuf was appointed governor of Iraq and reinstated al-Muhallab to lead the war against the Azariqa. Al-Muhallab forced their retreat to Kirman, where they split into two groups and were subsequently destroyed in 698–699.

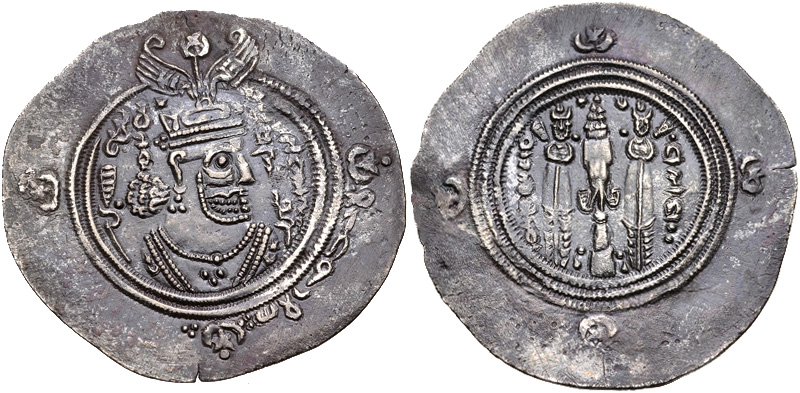
Arab-Sasanian dirham of the Azariqa leader Qatari ibn al-Fuja'a, struck circa 694–695, with the Kharijite slogan la hukma illa li-llah on the obverse margin

==== Najdat ====
During his time in Ahwaz, Najda broke with Ibn al-Azraq over the latter's extremist ideology. Najda, with his followers, moved to the Yamama, the homeland of his Banu Hanifa tribe. He became leader of Abu Talut's Kharijite faction, which became known as the Najdat after him. Najda took control of Bahrayn, repulsing a 14,000-strong Zubayrid army deployed against him. His lieutenant, Atiyya ibn al-Aswad, captured Oman from the local Julanda rulers, though the latter reasserted their control after a few months. Najda seized Hadramawt and Yemen in 687 and later captured Ta'if, a town close to Ibn al-Zubayr's capital Mecca, leaving the latter cornered in the Hejaz, as Najda controlled most of Arabia. Not long after, his followers became disillusioned with him for his alleged correspondence with the Umayyad caliph Abd al-Malik, irregular pay to his soldiers, his refusal to punish a soldier who had consumed wine, and his release of a captive granddaughter of caliph Uthman. He was thus deposed for having gone astray and subsequently executed in 691. Atiyya had already broken from Najda and moved to Sistan in eastern Persia, and was later killed there or in Sind. In Sistan, his followers split into various sects, including the Atawiyya and the Ajarida. In Arabia, Abu Fudayk Abd Allah ibn Thawr took over the leadership of the Najdat and defeated several Zubayrid and later Umayyad attacks. He was eventually killed along with 6,000 followers in 692 by Umayyad forces in Bahrayn. Politically exterminated, the Najdat retreated into obscurity and disappeared around the tenth century.

=== Moderate Kharijites and their fragmentation ===
According to the heresiographers' accounts, the original Kharijites split into four principal groups (usul al-Khawarij; the mother sects of all the later Kharijite sects), during the Second Fitna. A moderate group, headed by Abd Allah ibn Saffar (or Asfar) and Abd Allah ibn Ibad, disagreed with the radical Azariqa and Najdat on the question of rebellion and separation from the non-Kharijites. Ibn Saffar and Ibn Ibad then disagreed amongst themselves as to the faith of the non-Kharijites, and thus came the two other sects: the Sufriyya and Ibadiyya. All the other uncategorized Kharijite subgroups are considered offshoots of the Sufriyya. In this scheme, the Kharijites of the Jazira region (north-western Iraq), including the ascetic Salih ibn Mussarih and the tribal leader Shabib ibn Yazid al-Shaybani are associated with the Sufriyya, as well as the revolt of Al-Dahhak ibn Qays al-Shaybani during the Third Fitna (744–750). After Ibn Ibad's death, the Ibadiyya are considered to have been led into the late Umayyad period successively by Jabir ibn Zayd and Abu Ubayda Muslim ibn Abi Karima. Jabir, a respected scholar and traditionist, had friendly relations with Abd al-Malik and Hajjaj. Following the death of Abd al-Malik, relations between the Ibadiyya leaders and Hajjaj deteriorated, as the former became inclined towards activism (khuruj). Hajjaj consequently exiled some of them to Oman and imprisoned others. Abu Ubayda, who was released after the death of Hajjaj in 714, became the next leader of the Ibadiyya. After unsuccessfully attempting to win over the Umayyad caliphs to the Ibadi doctrine, he sent missionaries to propagate the doctrine in different parts of the empire. Almost simultaneously, the Sufriyya also spread into North Africa and southern Arabia through missionary activity. Through absorption into the Ibadiyya, the Sufriyya eventually became extinct. Ibadi sources too are more or less in line with this scheme, where the Ibadiyya appear as the true successors of the original Medinese community and the early, pre-Second-Fitna Kharijites, though Ibn Ibad does not feature prominently and Jabir is asserted as the leader of the movement following Abu Bilal Mirdas.

Modern historians consider Ibn Saffar to be a legendary figure, and assert that the Sufriyya and Ibadiyya sects did not exist during the seventh century. The heresiographers, whose aim was to categorize the divergent beliefs of the Kharijites, most likely invented the Sufriyya to accommodate those groups who did not fit neatly anywhere else. As such, there was only one moderate Kharijite current, which might have been called "Sufri". According to the historian Keith Lewinstein, the term probably originated with the pious early Kharijites because of their pale-yellow appearance (sufra) caused by excessive worship. The moderates condemned the militancy of the Azariqa and Najdat, but otherwise lacked a set of concrete doctrines. Jabir and Abu Ubayda may have been prominent figures in the moderate movement. The moderates further split into the true Sufriyya and Ibadiyya only during the eighth century, with the main difference being tribal affiliations rather than doctrinal differences.

During the Second Fitna, the moderates remained inactive. However, in the mid-690s they also started militant activities in response to persecution by Hajjaj. The first of their revolts was led in 695 by Ibn Musarrih, and ended in defeat and Ibn Musarrih's death. Afterward, this Kharijite group became a major threat to Kufa and its suburbs under Shabib. With a small army of a few hundred warriors, Shabib defeated several thousands-strong Umayyad armies in 695–696, looted Kufa's treasury and occupied al-Mada'in. From his base in al-Mada'in, Shabib moved to capture Kufa. Hajjaj had already requested Syrian troops from Abd al-Malik, who sent a 4,000-strong army which defeated Shabib outside Kufa. Shabib drowned in a river during his flight, his band was destroyed, but the Kharijites continued to maintain a presence in the Jazira.

==== Sufriyya ====
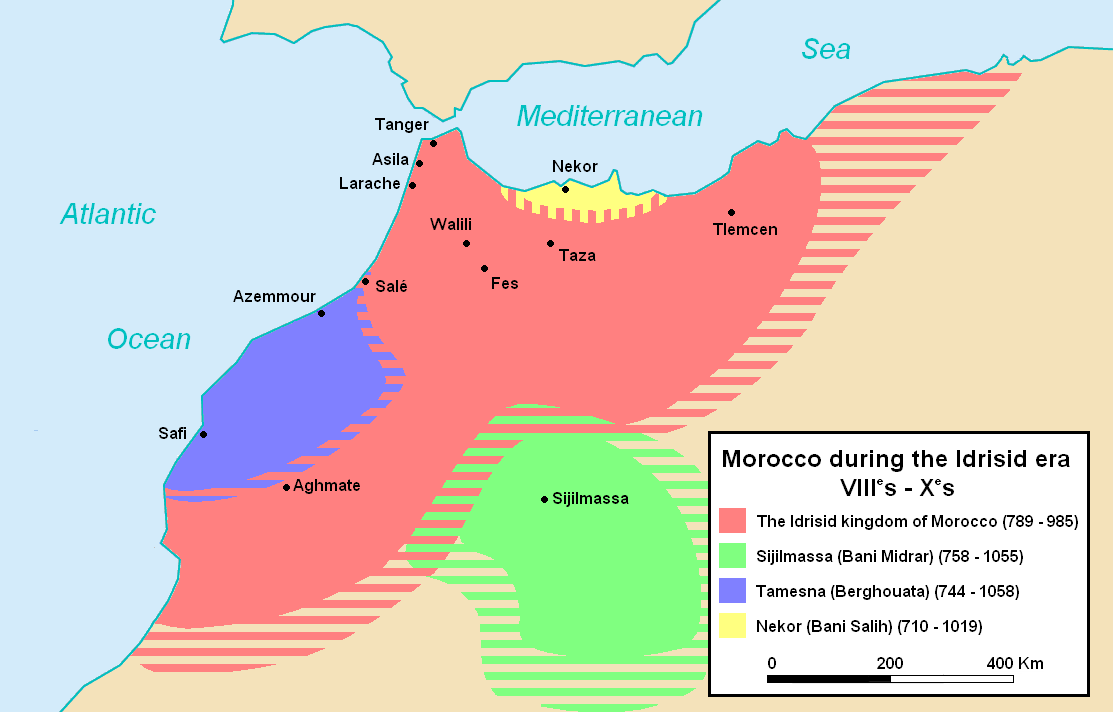
The Sufri Midrarid dynasty of Sijilmasa (green) lasted for around 150 years.

Distinct Sufriyya and Ibadiyya sects are attested from the early eighth century in North Africa and Oman. The two differed in association with different tribal groups and competed for popular support. During the last days of the Umayyad empire, a major Sufri revolt erupted in Iraq in 744. It was at first led by Sa'id ibn Bahdal al-Shaybani, and after his death from plague, al-Dahhak ibn Qays al-Shaybani. Joined by many more Sufriyya from other parts of the empire, he captured Kufa in April 745 and later Wasit, which had replaced Kufa as the regional capital under Hajjaj. At this stage even some Umayyad officials, including two sons of former caliphs, Sulayman ibn Hisham and Abd Allah ibn Umar ibn Abd al-Aziz, recognized him as caliph and joined his ranks. Al-Dahhak captured Mosul, but was killed by the forces of the Caliph Marwan II in 746. His successor, Shayban ibn Abd al-Aziz al-Yashkuri, was driven out from Mosul by Marwan II and fled to Fars to join the pro-Alid leader Abd Allah ibn Mu'awiya, who ruled in opposition to the Umayyads. Attacked there by the Umayyads, they dispersed and Shayban fled to Oman, where he was killed by the local leaders around 751. Under the Abbasids, who had toppled the Umayyads in 750, Sufri revolts in the eastern parts of the empire continued for almost two centuries, though at a small scale and were easily put down. However, in revolts led by Abd al-Hamid al-Bajali in 866–877 and by Harun ibn Abd Allah al-Bajali in 880–896, the Kharijites gained control of northern Mesopotamia from the Abbasids and collected taxes.

By the mid-8th century, the quietist Kharijites appeared in North Africa. They were mostly of Berber origin and were recruited through missionary activity. With the Ibadi–Sufri distinction emergent in this period, the groups with no Ibadi affiliation were associated with the Sufriyya. Around 740, the Sufriyya under the leadership of Maysara al-Matghari had revolted in Tangiers and captured the city from the Umayyads. They marched onto the provincial capital Kairouan, but were unable to capture it. Nevertheless, Sufri disturbances in North Africa continued throughout the Umayyad period. Around 750, the Sufri Midrarids established a dynasty in Sijilmasa, in modern Morocco. The dynasty survived until the Fatimid capture of the city in 909. Nonetheless, the Midrarids continued governing the city under intermittent Fatimid suzerainty until 976. The North African Sufriyya later disappeared, and their remnants were absorbed into the Ibadiyya around the tenth or 11th century.

==== Ibadiyya ====
In the early eighth century, a proto-Ibadi movement emerged from the Basran moderates. Missionaries were sent to propagate the doctrine in different parts of the empire including Oman, Yemen, Hadramawt, Khurasan, and North Africa. During the final years of the Umayyad Caliphate, the Ibadi propaganda movement caused several revolts in the periphery of the empire, though the leaders in Basra adopted the policy of kitman (also called taqiyya); concealing beliefs so as to avoid persecution.

The Ibadi Rustamid dynasty ruled over much of modern-day Algeria for over a century.

In 745, Abd Allah ibn Yahya al-Kindi established the first Ibadi state in Hadramawt, and captured Yemen in 746. His lieutenant, Abu Hamza Mukhtar ibn Aws al-Azdi, later conquered Mecca and Medina. The Umayyads defeated and killed Abu Hamza and Ibn Yahya in 748 and the first Ibadi state collapsed. An Ibadi state was established in Oman in 750 after the fall of Abu Yahya, but fell to the Abbasids in 752. It was followed by the establishment of another Ibadi state in 793, which survived for a century until the Abbasid recapture of Oman in 893. Abbasid influence in Oman was mostly nominal, and Ibadi imams continued to wield considerable power. Around a century later, Ibadi leader al-Khalil ibn Shathan al-Kharusi (r. 1016–1029) reasserted control over central Oman, whereas his successor Rashid ibn Sa'id al-Yahmadi (r. 1029–1053) drove the then Abbasid patrons Buyids out of the coastal region, thereby restoring the Ibadi control of Oman. Internal splits led to fall of the third Ibadi imamate in the late 12th century. Ibadi imamates were reestablished in subsequent centuries. Ibadis form the majority of the Omani population to date.

Ibadi missionary activity met with considerable success in North Africa. In 757, Ibadis seized Tripoli and captured Kairouan the next year. Driven out by an Abbasid army in 761, Ibadi leaders founded a state, which became known as the Rustamid dynasty, in Tahart. It was overthrown in 909 by the Fatimids. Ibadi communities continue to exist today in the Nafusa Mountains in northwestern Libya, Djerba island in Tunisia and the M'zab valley in Algeria. In East Africa they are found in Zanzibar. Ibadi missionary activity also reached Persia, India, Egypt, Sudan, Spain and Sicily, although Ibadi communities in these regions disappeared over time. The total numbers of the Ibadis in Oman and Africa are estimated to be around 2.5 million and 200,000 respectively.

== Beliefs and practices ==
The Kharijites did not have a uniform and coherent set of doctrines. Different sects and individuals held different views. Based on these divergences, heresiographers have listed more than a dozen minor Kharijite sects, in addition to the four main sects discussed above. (Note: Of these minor sects, the Hamziyya, likely a splinter of the Ajarida, held out against the Abbasids for some thirty years. Under the leadership of Hamza ibn Adarak, a local Kharijite, they rebelled c. 797 in Sistan, which had seen Kharijite activity since Umayyad times, and frequently raided towns in Khurasan. The Abbasids were unable to defeat them and the revolt ended only when Hamza died in 828. Kharijite activity in Sistan, Khurasan and other parts of Persia persisted until the end of the ninth century.)

=== Governance ===
In addition to their insistence on rule according to the Qur'an, the view common to all Kharijite groups was that any Muslim was qualified to become caliph, regardless of origin, if he had the credentials of belief and piety. They rejected Qurayshite descent or close kinship with Muhammad as a prerequisite for the office, a view espoused by most Muslims at the time. (Note: All rulers were drawn exclusively from the Quraysh during the entire period of the Kharijites' existence.) This differs from the position of both Sunnis, who accepted the leadership of those in power provided that they were Qurayshite, and Shi'a, who asserted that the leadership belonged to Ali and his descendants. The Kharijites held that the first four caliphs had not been elected for their Qurayshite descent or kinship with Muhammad, but because they were among the most eminent and qualified Muslims for the position, and hence were all legitimate caliphs. In particular, they had a high regard for Abu Bakr (r. 632–634) and Umar (r. 634–644) as, according to them, they governed justly. Uthman, on the other hand, had deviated from the path of justice and truth in the latter half of his caliphate and was thus liable to be killed or deposed, whereas Ali committed a grave sin when he agreed to the arbitration with Mu'awiya. In contrast to the Umayyad idea that their rule was ordained by God, the Kharijite idea of leadership lacked any divine sanctioning; only correct attitude and piety granted the leader authority over the community. If the leader committed a sin and deviated from the right path or failed to manage Muslims' affairs through justice and consultation, he was obliged to acknowledge his mistake and repent, or else he forfeited his right to rule and was subject to deposition. In the view of the Azariqa and the Najdat, Muslims had the duty to revolt against such a ruler.

Almost all Kharijite groups considered the position of a leader (imam) to be necessary. Many Kharijite leaders adopted the title of amir al-mu'minin, which was usually reserved for caliphs. An exception are the Najdat, who, as a means of survival, abandoned the requirement of war against non-Kharijites after their defeat in 692, and rejected that the imamate was an obligatory institution. The historian Patricia Crone has described the Najdat's philosophy as an early form of anarchism.

=== Other doctrines ===
The Kharijites also asserted that faith without accompanying deeds is useless, and that anyone who commits a major sin is an unbeliever (kafir; pl. kuffar) and must repent to restore the true faith. However, the Kharijite notion of unbelief (kufr) differed from the mainstream Muslim definition, which understood a kafir as someone who was a non-Muslim. To the Kharijites, kufr implied a defective Muslim, or pseudo-Muslim, who rejected true Islam. The Azariqa held a more extreme position that such unbelievers were in fact polytheists and apostates who could not reenter Islam and could be killed, along with their women and children. Intermarriage between the Kharijites and such unbelievers was forbidden in the Azariqa doctrine. The Najdat allowed marriages with non-Kharijites. Of the moderates, the Sufriyya and Bayhasiyya (Note: Followers of Abu Bayhas, who is said to have criticized the Azariqa for going too far, by legitimizing murder of non-Kharijite Muslims and their families, and the Ibadiyya for not going far enough, as they did not consider other Muslims as unbelievers. It is almost certain that this sect too developed later and not during the second civil war as the sources assert.) considered all non-Kharijite Muslims as unbelievers, but also abstained from taking up arms against them, unless necessary, and allowed intermarriage with them. The Ibadiyya, on the other hand, did not declare the non-Kharijites as polytheists or unbelievers in the general sense, rather as hypocrites (kuffar bil-nifaq), or ungrateful for God's blessings (kuffar bil-ni'ma). They also permitted marriages outside their own sect.

The Azariqa and Najdat held that since the Umayyad rulers, and all non-Kharijites in general, were unbelievers, it was unlawful to continue living under their rule (dar al-kufr), for that was in itself an act of unbelief. It was thus obligatory to emigrate, in emulation of Muhammad's Hijra to Medina, and establish a legitimate dominion of their own (dar al-hijra). The Azariqa prohibited the practice of dissimulation of their faith (taqiyya) and branded non-activist Kharijites (i.e., those who did not emigrate to their camp) as unbelievers. The Najdat allowed taqiyya and quietism, but labeled their practitioners as hypocrites. The Islamicist Montgomery Watt attributes this moderation of the Najdat stance to practical necessities which they encountered while governing Arabia, as the administration of a large area required flexibility and allowance for human imperfection. The Sufriyya and Ibadiyya held that while the establishment of a legitimate dominion was desirable, it was legal to employ taqiyya and continue living among the non-Kharijites if rebellion was not possible.

The Kharijites espoused that all Muslims were equals, regardless of ethnicity, and advocated for equal status of the mawali (sing. mawla; non-Arab, free Muslims of conquered lands, especially Iraq and Persia) with the Arabs. The Najdat chose a mawla, a fruit seller named Thabit, as their leader after Najda's execution. This choice, however, conflicted with their feelings of ethnic solidarity and they soon asked him to step down and choose an Arab leader for them; he chose Abu Fudayk. The leader of the Azariqa, Ibn al-Azraq, is said to have been the son of a mawla of Greek origin. The imams of the North African Kharijites from 740 onwards were all non-Arabs. The Kharijites also advocated for the equality of women with men. On the basis of women fighting alongside Muhammad, the Kharijites viewed jihad as incumbent upon women. The warrior and poet Layla bint Tarif is a famous example. Shabib's wife Ghazala participated in his battles against the troops of Hajjaj. The Kharijites had a scrupulous attitude towards non-Muslims, respecting their dhimmi (protected) status more seriously than others.

Some of the Kharijites rejected the punishment of adultery with stoning, which is prescribed in other Islamic legal schools. Although the Qur'an does not prescribe this penalty, Muslims of other sects hold that such a verse existed in the Qur'an, which was then abrogated from recitation, but not from practice. A hadith is ascribed to Umar, asserting the existence of this verse in the Qur'an. These Kharijites rejected the authenticity of such a verse. The heresiographer al-Ash'ari attributed this position to the Azariqa, who held a strict scripturalist position in legal matters (i.e. following only the Qur'an and rejecting commonly held views if they had no Qur'anic basis), and thus also refused to enforce legal punishment on slanderers when the slander was targeted at a male. The Azariqa instituted the practice of testing the faith of new recruits (mihna), which is said to have involved giving them a prisoner to kill. It was either an occasional practice, as held by Watt, or a later distortion by the heresiographers, as held by Lewinstein. One of the Kharijite groups also refused to recognize the sura (Qur'anic chapter) of Yusuf as being an original part of the Qur'an, for they considered its content to be worldly and frivolous.

== Poetry ==
Many Kharijites were well-versed in traditional Arabic eloquence and poetry, which the orientalist Giorgio Levi Della Vida attributes to the majority of their early leaders being from Bedouin stock. The sermons and poems of many Kharijite leaders were compiled into collections (diwans). Kharijite poetry is mainly concerned with religious beliefs, with piety and activism, martyrdom, selling life to God (shira), and afterlife being some of the most prominent themes, though the themes of heroism and courage are also evident. Referring to his rebellion, Abu Bilal Mirdas said: "Fear of God and the dread of the fire made me go out, and selling my soul for which has no price [paradise]".

Some poems encouraged militant activism. Imran ibn Hittan, whom the Arabist Michael Cooperson calls the greatest Kharijite poet, sang after Abu Bilal's death: "Abū Bilāl has increased my disdain for this life; and strengthened my love for the khurūj [rebellion]". The poet Abu'l-Wazi al-Rasibi addressed Ibn al-Azraq, before the latter became activist, with the lines:

Your tongue does no harm to the enemy
you will only gain salvation from distress by means of your two hands.

The government was often labelled as tyrannical and obedience to it was criticized. The Kharijite poet Isa ibn Fatik al-Khatti thus sang:

You obeyed the orders of the stubborn tyrant
but no obedience is due to oppressors.

Many poems were written to eulogize fallen Kharijite activists, and thus represent the romanticized version of actual historical events. The Muhakkima are thus valorized and remembered at many places. The poet Aziz ibn al-Akhnas al-Ta'i eulogized them in the following lines:

I complain to God that from every tribe
of people, battle has annihilated the best.

Similarly, Ali's assassin Ibn Muljam was exalted by the poet Ibn Abi Mayyas al-Muradi in the following:

You upon whom be blessings, we have struck Ḥaydar ['the lion'; a nickname for Ali]
Abū Ḥasan [Ali] with a blow to the head and he was split apart.

Kharijite poetry has survived mainly in the non-Kharijite sources, and hence may have been subject to alteration by its transmitters. Nevertheless, the historian Fred Donner believes that Kharijite poetry may have suffered a lesser and "different kind" of interpolation than the historical accounts about the Kharijites. According to Hagemann, poetry is seemingly "the only genuinely Khārijite material" in existence. A modern compilation of Kharijite poetry was published by Ihsan Abbas in 1974.

== Tribal affiliations ==
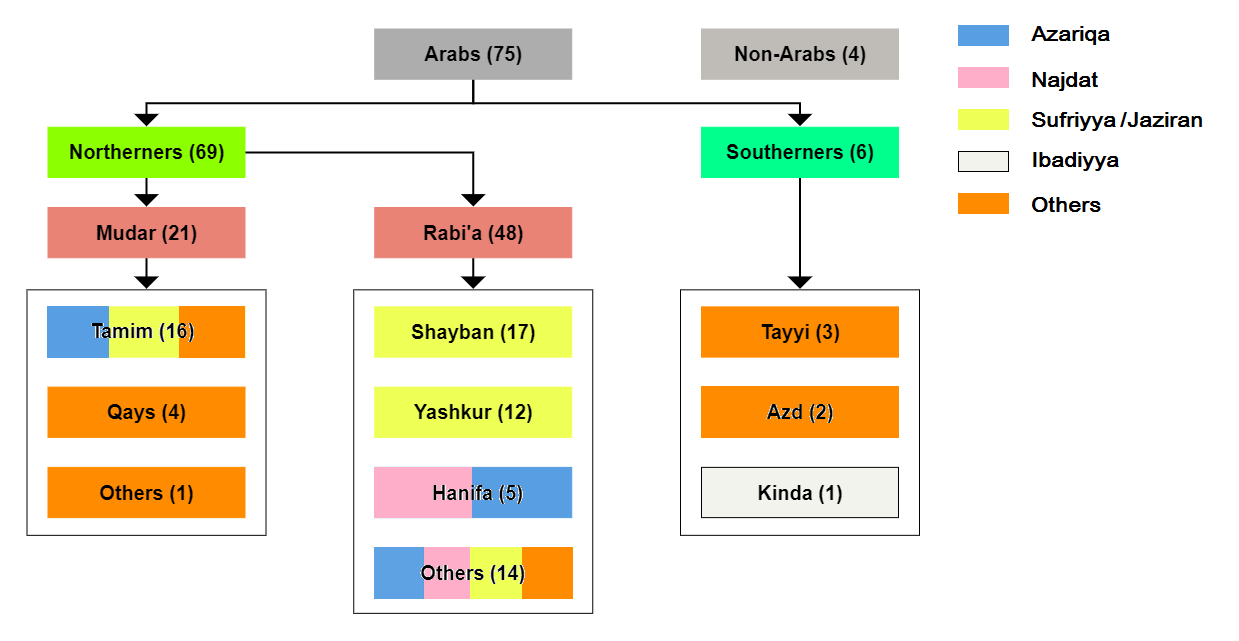
The tribal origins of the identified Kharijite leaders from the Umayyad period (661–750)

Most Kharijite leaders in the Umayyad period were Arabs. Of these, the northern Arabs were the overwhelming majority. Only six or seven revolts led by a southern Arab have been reported, their leaders hailing from the tribes of Tayy, Azd, and Kinda. Among the northern Arabs, the Rabi'a group produced most of the Kharijite leaders. Of the 48 identified Rabi'a leaders, 46 were from the Bakr ibn Wa'il branch (17 from the Shayban sub-tribe, 12 from Yashkur, five from Hanifa, and 12 from other sub-tribes). Among the northern Arab Mudar group, the Tamim accounted for the majority, with 16 of the 21 Mudar leaders hailing from the tribe; the other leaders were from the Qays. Three or four revolts were led by a mawla or a Berber.

The Rabi'a were associated with the early Jaziran Kharijites (whom the sources label as Sufriyya), and the eighth-century Sufriyya, though the Hanifa subtribe of the Rabi'a were mainly represented in the Azariqa and the Najdat. The Tamim were also represented among the early Jaziran Kharijites, as well as the Azariqa. The southerners, especially the Kinda and Azd, were drawn to the Ibadiyya in the eighth century. Nonetheless, it was individuals, rather than whole tribes, who joined the Kharijite ranks, the majority being younger or otherwise of obscure origins. Few, if any, of the ashraf (tribal nobility) were among them. The historian Khalid Yahya Blankinship considers the Rabi'a affinity to Kharijism as rooted in their lower military and social status. They were considered by the Umayyad administration as being poor military leaders, and otherwise backward. Their relatively late conversion to Islam also resulted in them finding only low-ranking military roles, as the higher positions had already been filled by men from other tribes. As such, Blankinship views Kharijism as a political protest cloaked in religious zeal, and considers the Kharijites as no more than rebels. Watt has suggested that the northern Arabs, having had no experience of central administration and government, were more susceptible to Kharijism as opposed to the southerners. The culture and collective thinking of the latter was influenced by the ancient kingdoms of South Arabia, where kings were seen as charismatic leaders with superhuman qualities. As a result, they were drawn more to Shia Islam than to Kharijism.

== Legacy ==
=== Historical analysis ===
According to Rudolf Ernst Brünnow (1858–1917), the first academic historian to systematically study the Kharijites, the qurra supported the arbitration proposal because, as pious believers in the Qur'an, they felt obliged to respond to the call of making the Qur'an the arbitrator. The people who objected to the treaty were Bedouin Arabs, and hence separate from the qurra who had settled in Kufa and Basra following the wars of conquest. They had devoted themselves to the cause of Islam and perceived the arbitration by two people as an acute religious injustice, which drove them into secession and later into open rebellion.

The orientalist Julius Wellhausen (1844–1918) criticized Brünnow's hypothesis because all Basrans and Kufans of that time were Bedouin, and since Brünnow regards these Bedouin as pious anyway, it distinguishes them little from the qurra. Hence, the same group of people first favored and then rejected the arbitration. They initially accepted arbitration of the Qur'an, but some later realized and acknowledged this was a mistake, repented, and demanded the same from Ali. In Wellhausen's view, the Kharijites thus emanated from the qurra. He argues that the Kharijite dogmatism was based on enforcement of the rule of God on Earth—an otherwise Islamic principle, taken too far by the Kharijites: "By tightening onto the principles of Islam, they are taken beyond Islam itself". They gave precedence to it over the integrity of the community as it was openly opposing God's commands in their view. Wellhausen rejects the notion of the Kharijites as anarchists, for they strove to build their own pious communities. But their goals were impractical and hostile to culture.

According to Donner, the qurra might have been motivated by fears that the arbitration could result in them being held accountable for their involvement in Uthman's murder. Analyzing early Kharijite poetry, Donner has further suggested that the Kharijites were pious believers who often expressed their piety in militant activism. Their religious worldview was based on Qur'anic values, and they may have been the "real true believers" and "authentic representatives of the earliest community" of Muslims, instead of a divergent sect as presented by the sources. Their militancy may have been caused by the expectation of the imminent end of the world, for the level of violence in their revolts and their extreme longing for martyrdom cannot be explained solely on the basis of belief in the afterlife. In Donner's view, it rather implies a level of urgency.

Several modern historians also reject the traditional view that Kharijism originated at Siffin as a militant protest to the arbitration, without having any prior causes. According to Crone, the story of the dispute over the arbitration is inadequate, and perhaps there was more to the dispute between Ali and the Kharijites than reported in the sources. G. R. Hawting has suggested that the use of the la hukma slogan by the Kharijites to denounce the arbitration is a later reworking by the Muslim sources. In his view, the Kharijites originally espoused the slogan, amid the religious disputes among the Muslims over the scriptural authority, in order to reject the authority of the sunna and the oral law in favor of the Qur'an.

The historians M. A. Shaban and Martin Hinds consider socioeconomic factors the root of Kharijite rebellions. Rejecting the notion that the qurra were the Qur'an readers, Shaban holds that they were villagers who had gained status in Iraq during the caliphate of Umar for their loyalty to the state during the Wars of Apostasy that followed Muhammad's death, and were thus awarded the trusteeship of the fertile lands of Iraq. They were dissatisfied with the economic policies of Uthman and saw Ali's caliphate as a means of restoring their status. When he agreed to talks with Mu'awiya they felt their status threatened and consequently rebelled. According to Shaban, the main role in forcing Ali to accept the arbitration was not played by the qurra but by the tribal chiefs, as the latter group had benefited from the policies of Uthman. They were not enthusiastic supporters of Ali, and considered the prospect of continued war as contrary to their interests. In Shaban's thesis, the Kharijite rebellions after Siffin also had economic origins. In Hinds's view, the status of the qurra was based on Umar's principle of sabiqa (early conversion to Islam) and their participation in the early conquests. They hoped that Ali would continue Umar's system and accordingly backed him. They supported the arbitration because they assumed it would bring an end to the war, with Ali retaining the caliphate and returning to Medina, leaving the administration of Iraq in the hands of the local population, including themselves. They denounced the arbitration upon realizing that Ali was not recognized as caliph in the document, and that the arbiters could use their own judgment in addition to the Qur'anic principles.

In the view of Watt, it was neither religious grounds, nor economic factors that gave rise to the Kharijites. His view is that Kharijism was the nomadic response to the newly established organized state. The nomads, accustomed to the independent lifestyle of the desert, suddenly found their freedoms curtailed by the powerful bureaucracy of a "vast administrative machine". The rebellion at Siffin was thus an expression of this rejection of state control. From then on, they strove to recreate the pre-Islamic tribal structure and Bedouin lifestyle, on a religious basis. The historian Hugh N. Kennedy describes the Kharijites as ultra-pious people who were dissatisfied with perceived laxity in religion on the part of other people and the state, and felt that the religion was being exploited for personal gains. They thus came to reject both the traditional tribal society and the urban lifestyle that the state had forced upon the people by relocating them to the garrison towns. The movement was an attempt to find a third way: an independent, egalitarian, nomadic society based on unadulterated religion. The Islamicist Chase F. Robinson describes the Jaziran Kharijites as disgruntled army commanders with tribal followings, who adopted Kharijism to provide a religious cover to their banditry.

Hagemann and Verkinderen differentiate between intellectual and militant Kharijism. In their view, the former was concerned with the rule of God and rejection of corrupt government. The latter was not always a protest of the former as the sources assert; in many cases it had variety of causes such as increased taxation, state control of resources, and discrimination against the mawali. They explain the diversity of views by other historians as stemming from the historians' focus on one particular group of Kharijites with the assumption that it represented the Kharijite movement in general.

In the long term, the activism of the militant Kharijites and their consistent suppression by the government resulted in their disappearance. Additionally, they became less capable of resistance as the majority of the population became Muslim: dhimmi non-Muslims were neutral towards them and were thus treated well, while their enemies were rival Muslims. No militant Kharijite sect survived beyond the 12th century. The quietists' more nuanced and practical approach, in which they preferred taqiyya over hijra, engaged in organized and sustainable military campaigns and institution-building, as opposed to aggressive pursuit of martyrdom, all contributed to their survival.

=== Contribution to Muslim theology ===
According to Della Vida, despite its popular outlook, the Kharijite movement was not devoid of intellectualism. Wellhausen has argued that Kharijite dogmatism influenced the development of the mainstream Muslim theology, in particular their debates in relation to faith and deeds, and legitimate leadership. In Della Vida's view, the Mu'tazila, a rationalist school of thought in early Islam that originated in the eighth century, in particular were likely influenced by them. The influence on the mainstream dogma could have been direct adaptation of some Kharijite ideas, or that Kharijite views confronted mainstream theologians to the questions of faith.

In the eighth and ninth centuries, Kharijite, especially Ibadi, theologians contributed to the debates concerning the problems of divine unity versus multiplicity of divine attributes, and predestination versus free will. Concerning divine attributes, they agreed with the Mu'tazila in that the attributes of essence (attributes that God must have; e.g. knowledge and power) are different from the attributes of act (those that exist outside of him; such as creation and speech), but held that divine will was an attribute of essence. As such God wills from eternity, which means that everything is predetermined. Consequently, they rejected the doctrine of human free will. According to Wilferd Madelung, they were likely the first group to hold the view of the divine will being an attribute of essence, which was eventually adopted by the Sunni theologians. The Kharijite theologians also rejected anthropomorphist theology, and agreed with the Mu'tazila on the created nature of the Qur'an.

The Kharijites were the first group to declare other Muslims kuffar, a designation previously reserved for non-Muslims. The influence of this led to the transformation of the concept of kufr in later Sunni theology; in addition to unbelief, kufr acquired the meaning of heterodoxy and heresy. In the view of Watt, the Kharijite insistence on the rule according to the Qur'an prevented the early Muslim empire from turning into a purely secular Arab state. The rest of the Muslims eventually adopted this view that all political and social life of the Muslims should be based on the divine law (Sharia) derived from the Qur'an, although they added to its sources the sunna of Muhammad.

=== Traditional Muslim view ===
The Kharijites drew condemnation by traditional Muslim historians and heresiographers of subsequent centuries. In order to make clearer the distinction between orthodoxy and heterodoxy, the mainstream sources attempted to portray the Kharijites as a monolithic, identifiable group, with the characteristics and practices of the most radical sect, the Azariqa, being presented as representative of the whole. The term Khawarij, which originally meant those who went out of Kufa to gather at Nahrawan during the time of Ali, was subsequently understood as 'outsiders'—those who went out of the fold of the Muslim community—rebels, and brutal extremists.

The non-Kharijite Muslims attribute several hadiths to Muhammad, prophesying the emergence of the Kharijites. After the Battle of Hunayn in 630, a man known as Dhu al-Khuwaysira is reported to have accused Muhammad of unjustly distributing the spoils. Umar reportedly asked for Muhammad's permission to kill the man, but the latter declined, saying:

Let him go, there will be people from him who will pray and fast so eagerly that your prayer and fasting will seem comparatively small to you; they plunge so deeply into the religion that they come out on the other side, like a sharp arrow through a target on which no trace of blood and flesh remains.

A similar hadith attributed to Muhammad is:

There will emerge from [Iraq] a people who will recite the Qur'an but it will not go beyond their throats, and they will stray from Islam as an arrow strays from the animal.

Other hadiths with themes of "arrow through the target" or "the Qur'an not going beyond throats" are reported. Although the hadiths do not name the Kharijites or any particular Kharijite individual, they are generally viewed by non-Kharijite Muslims as references to the Kharijites. Some hadiths of this type encouraged other Muslims to eliminate the Kharijites.

=== Modern times ===
In the modern era, many Muslim theologians and clerics have compared the beliefs and actions of modern Islamist extremists such as the Islamic State, al-Qaeda, the Muslim Brotherhood, and Tehrik-i-Taliban Pakistan to those of the Kharijites, labeling them as modern or neo-Kharijites. In particular, the groups are alleged to share the militant Kharijites' anarchist and radical approach, whereby self-described Muslims are declared unbelievers and therefore deemed worthy of death. However, Islamic State and al-Qaeda preachers reject being compared to the Kharijites, instead calling themselves the true Muslims and their opponents lax Muslims. The intended effect of these accusations is usually to deny the Islamists any widespread public support, given the very unpopular image of the Kharijites among the Muslims. The comparison is criticized by modern historians, who argue that the socio-political context and environment giving rise to the modern militants differs too widely from that of the Kharijites to warrant any justifiable comparison between the two, and that such comparisons often result from a superficial understanding of the doctrines of either group.

Although most modern Arab historians have been critical of the Kharijites, some have presented a more favorable view. The latter group argue that the Kharijites rebelled against economic injustice and had valid grievances. They compare the Kharijite ideals of ethnic and gender equality with the modern equivalents of these values and consider them representatives of elective thought in early Islam. Modern Ibadi scholars have attempted to soften the image of the Kharijites, in order to reconcile their differences with rest of the Muslims. They assert that mainstream Muslim accounts of the Kharijite history are distorted and present the early Kharijites unfairly, as they were simply protesting against injustice. At the same time, Ibadis also protest against being labelled as a Kharijite sect. They associate the term with the Azariqa, Najdat, and the Sufriyya, whom they condemn; the Muhakkima, on the other hand, they hold in high regard. One modern Ibadi author claims that the Muhakkima did not rebel against Ali but only had a difference of opinion with him. It was not Ali who fought them at Nahrawan, but the Kufan nobleman al-Ash'ath ibn Qays.

== See also ==
- Banu Najiyah revolt
- Kharijite Rebellions (657–661)
