= Adam Gaiser =

American scholar of Islamic studies

Adam Russell Gaiser is a scholar of Islamic studies specialising on the development of early Kharijites and Ibadiyya.

== Biography ==
Gaiser was born on November 18, 1971, in Fairfax, Virginia. He is Professor in the Department of Religion at Florida State University (from 2018). Gaiser studied and took his bachelor's degree in 1994 in the field of Comparative Religions from College of William and Mary in Williamsburg, Virginia. In 2002 Adam Gaiser took his master's degree in History of Religions focused on Islamic Studies from the University of Virginia. In 2005 Adam Gaiser completed his PhD studies, focused on Ibadi studies, writing his PhD thesis about the origins and development of the Ibadi Imamate. From 2005 Gaiser held the position of Lecturer in the Department of Religious Studies, University of Virginia. From 2005 until 2006 Gaiser was visiting Assistant Professor in the Department of Religious Studies at the College of the Holy Cross. From 2006 until 2012 he was Assistant Professor in the Department of Religion at Florida State University, and from 2012 until 2017 he was Associate Professor there. Gaiser's academic and research interests are early Islamic Sectarianism, Islamic Heresiography, Islamic and Eastern Christian conceptions of martyrdom, and early Islamic history in Europe and North Africa.

== Works ==
- The origin and development of the Ibadi Imamate ideal. Charlottesville, VA, 2005. Ph.D. thesis, University of Virginia, History of Religions. See Gaiser 2010.
- Muslims, scholars, soldiers: the origin and elaboration of the Ibāḍī Imamate. Oxford/New York: Oxford University Press, 2010 ISBN 978-0-19-973893-9.
- Shurāt Legends, Ibādī Identities: Martyrdom, Asceticism, and the Making of an Early Islamic Community. Columbia: University of South Carolina Press, 2016. ISBN 978-1-61117-676-6
- Sectarian in Islam: The Umma Divided. Cambridge: Cambridge University Press, 2023. ISBN 978-1107032255.
