= Nafi ibn al-Azraq =

Kharijite leader in the Second Fitna (died circa 685)

Nafi ibn al-Azraq ibn Qays al-Hanafi al-Bakri (Arabic: نافع بن الأزرق بن قيس الحنفي البكري, romanized: Nāfiʿ ibn al-Azraq ibn Qays al-Ḥanafī al-Bakrī; died 685) was the leader of the Kharijite faction of the Azariqa during the Second Fitna.

His ethnic origin is not certain but his father was probably a freedman of Greek origin which, according to the historian Benjamin Jokisch, is further supported by his name, which was uncommon among the Arabs. Alternatively, he was an Arab from Banu Hanifa. He is said to have been a quietist before he was encouraged by the Kharijite poet Abu al-Wazi to become active. Abu al-Wazi then practically demonstrated that to him by attacking a person who spoke against the Kharijites. During the first siege of Mecca in 683 he sided with Abd Allah ibn al-Zubayr to defend the city against the Umayyad besiegers but after the siege was over left him because of a difference of opinion on the murder of the third caliph Uthman (r. 644–656) and went to Basra where the city was already in civil war over tribal disputes. He took over the control of the city by murdering the deputy governor and broke open the prison to free his fellow Kharijites. He was later expelled by the new Zubayrid governor and fled to Ahwaz along with his followers. From there he undertook several raids against the southern Iraqi settlements before being killed by the government forces in 685.

The Azariqa were the most radical of all the Kharijite groups, their doctrines being attributed to Nafi. These included disassociating with the quietist Kharijites, testing the faith of new recruits to see if they sincerely believed in the Kharijite dogma and permitting the murder of women and children of opponents.

== Bibliography ==
- Gaiser, Adam (2010). Muslims, Scholars, Soldiers: The Origin and Elaboration of the Ibadi Imamate Traditions. Oxford: Oxford University Press. ISBN 9780199738939.
- Jokisch, Benjamin (2011). Islamic Imperial Law: Harun-Al-Rashid's Codification Project. De Gruyter. ISBN 978-3-11-092434-3.
- Wellhausen, Julius (1901). Die religiös-politischen Oppositionsparteien im alten Islam (in German). Berlin: Weidmannsche buchhandlung. OCLC 453206240.
- Wensinck, A. J. (1993). "Nāfiʿ b. al-Azraḳ al-Ḥanafī al-Ḥanẓali". In Bosworth, C. E.; van Donzel, E.; Heinrichs, W. P. & Pellat, Ch. (eds.). The Encyclopaedia of Islam, Second Edition. Volume VII: Mif–Naz. Leiden: E. J. Brill. pp. 877–878. ISBN 978-90-04-09419-2.
