= Masrur ibn al-Walid =

8th-century Umayyad prince

Masrur ibn al-Walid مسرور بن الوليد

Governor of Jund Qinnasrin
- In office: 744 – January 745
- Born: Syria, Umayyad Caliphate
- Died: 746/49; Syria, Umayyad Caliphate
Names
- Abu Sa'id Masrur ibn al-Walid ibn Abd al-Malik
- Dynasty: Umayyad
- Father: Al-Walid I
- Religion: Islam
- Military career
- Relatives: al-Walid II (cousin); Yazid III (brother); Ibrahim (brother); Bishr (brother)
- Allegiance: Umayyad Caliphate
- Rank: Commander
- Conflicts: 744 Homs rebellion

Abu Sa'id Masrur ibn al-Walid ibn Abd al-Malik (أبو سعيد مسرور بن الوليد بن عبد الملك) was an Umayyad prince and governor of Jund Qinnasrin (military district of northern Syria) during the reign of his brother, Caliph Yazid III (r. 744–744). He played a role in the Third Muslim Civil War as a commander for Yazid III against rebels from Homs.

== Life ==
Masrur was a son of the Umayyad caliph al-Walid I (r. 705–715) and one of his slave concubines. Masrur had several half-brothers and at least one full brother, Bishr. He was married to a daughter of al-Hajjaj ibn Yusuf, the powerful viceroy of his father.

During the Third Muslim Civil War (744–750), Caliph al-Walid II (r. 743–744) was assassinated and his cousin and opponent, Yazid III, a half-brother of Masrur, became caliph. In protest the troops of Homs revolted under Mu'awiya ibn Yazid al-Sakuni and were supported by the districts governor, the Umayyad prince Marwan ibn Abdallah ibn Abd al-Malik. Yazid III dispatched Masrur and their nephew al-Walid ibn Rawh ibn al-Walid against them. They encamped at nearby Huwwarin, whereupon their cousin, Sulayman ibn Hisham, took command of the troops. The Homs rebels made for Damascus and were confronted by Sulayman and Masrur and were ultimately defeated by the intervention of another Umayyad cousin, Abd al-Aziz ibn al-Hajjaj ibn Abd al-Malik.

Yazid III appointed Masrur or Bishr governor of Jund Qinnasrin. The caliph died before the end of the year and was succeeded by another half-brother of Masrur, Ibrahim, whose rule was opposed by a distant Umayyad relative, the powerful general of the Jazira, Marwan II. The latter marched on Syria. When he came upon Qinnasrin, its sympathetic troops surrendered Masrur and Bishr to Marwan II, who had them imprisoned. Nothing is heard of them afterward and they are presumed to have died in prison.

== Bibliography ==
- Chowdhry, Shiv Rai (1972). Al-Ḥajjāj ibn Yūsuf (An Examination of His Works and Personality) (Thesis). University of Delhi.
- Crone, Patricia (1980). Slaves on Horses: The Evolution of the Islamic Polity (1980 ed.). Cambridge: Cambridge University Press. ISBN 978-0521229616.
- Hillenbrand, Carole, ed. (1989). The History of al-Ṭabarī, Volume XXVI: The Waning of the Umayyad Caliphate: Prelude to Revolution, A.D. 738–744/A.H. 121–126. SUNY Series in Near Eastern Studies. Albany, New York: State University of New York Press. ISBN 978-0-88706-810-2.
- Marsham, Andrew (2022). "Kinship, Dynasty, and the Umayyads". The Historian of Islam at Work: Essays in Honor of Hugh N. Kennedy. Leiden: Brill. pp. 12–45. ISBN 978-90-04-52523-8.
- Vaglieri, L. Veccia (1960). "Bishr b. al-Walīd". In Gibb, H. A. R.; Kramers, J. H.; Lévi-Provençal, E.; Schacht, J.; Lewis, B. & Pellat, Ch. (eds.). The Encyclopaedia of Islam, Second Edition. Volume I: A–B. Leiden: E. J. Brill. p. 1244. OCLC 495469456.
