= First Fitna =

Rashidun-era Muslim civil war (656 to 661)

- Part of the Fitnas
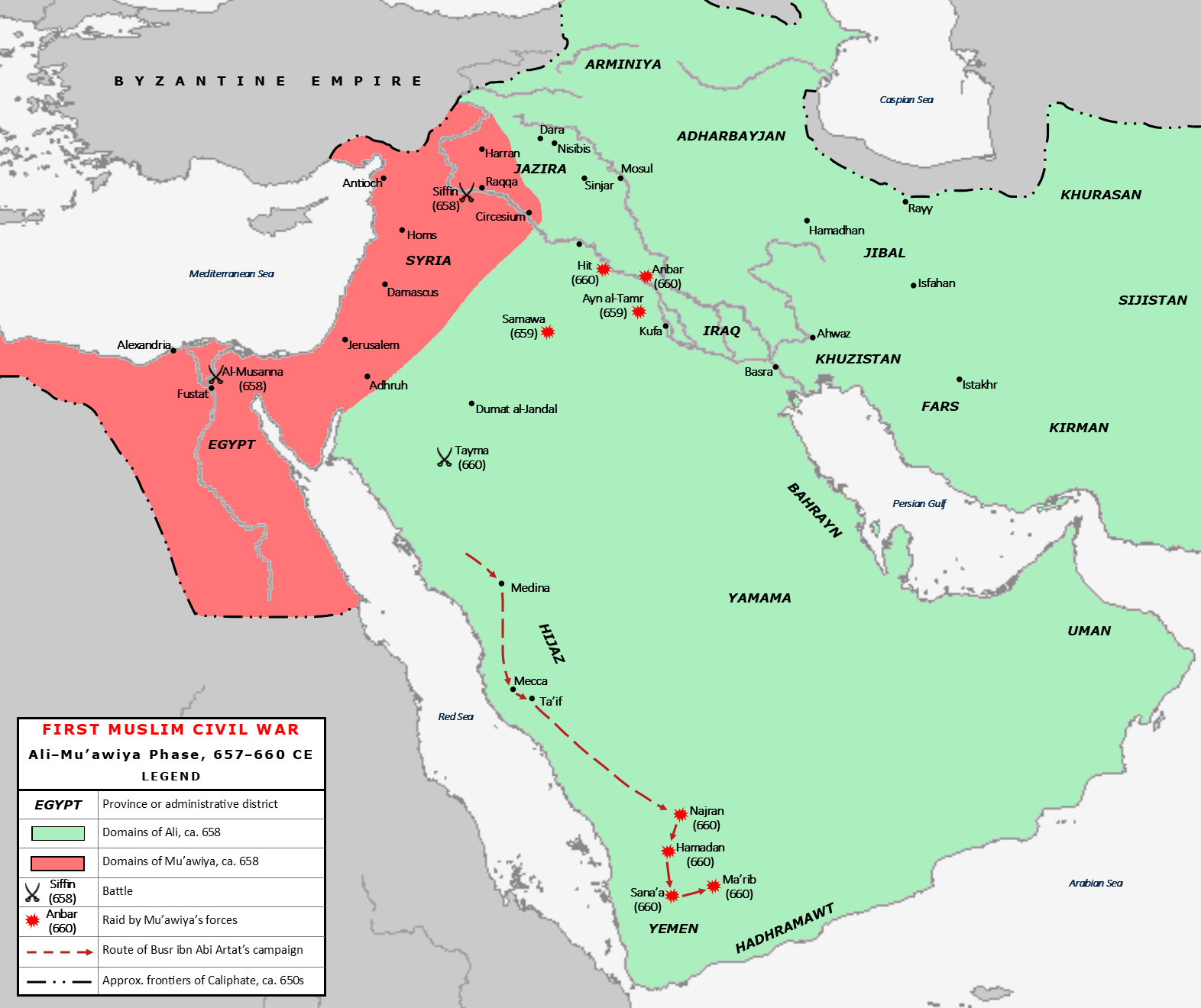
- Map of the Ali–Mu'awiya conflict of the First Fitna Region under the control of Caliph Ali Region under the control of Mu'awiya
Date	c. 656–661 CE
Location	Arabia; Syria; Jazira; Egypt; Iraq
Result	Umayyad victory: Kharijite rebellions suppressed; Hasan–Mu'awiya treaty; Dissolution of the Rashidun Caliphate; Establishment of the Umayyad Caliphate

Belligerents
Rashidun Caliphate	Umayyad Syria; Uthmaniyya	Kharijites

Commanders and leaders
Ali X Hasan ibn Ali (WIA); Husayn ibn Ali; Malik al-Ashtar X Ammar ibn Yasir †; Muhammad ibn Abi Bakr †	Mu'awiya (WIA); Aisha (POW); Talha †; Zubayr X Amr ibn al-As; Marwan ibn al-Hakam (POW); Abd Allah ibn Amir	Abd Allah ibn Wahb †; Hurqus ibn Zuhayr †; Zayd ibn Hisn †; Abd al-Rahman ibn Muljam (executed)

The First Fitna (Arabic: الفتنة الكبرى) was the first civil war in the Islamic community. It led to the end of the Rashidun Caliphate and the establishment of the Umayyad Caliphate. The civil war involved three main factions: the supporters of Ali, the fourth Rashidun caliph; the Uthmaniyya (partisans of the slain caliph Uthman, comprising Aisha's faction in Basra and Mu'awiya's Umayyad partisans in Syria); and, from 657 onward, the Kharijites, who seceded from Ali's camp following the arbitration at Siffin.

The roots of the first civil war can be traced back to the assassination of the second Rashidun caliph, Umar. Before he died from his wounds, Umar formed a six-member council which elected Uthman as the next caliph. During the final years of Uthman's caliphate, he was accused of nepotism and killed by rebels in 656. After Uthman's assassination, Ali was elected the fourth caliph, though his accession was immediately clouded by the unresolved murder of his predecessor. Aisha, Talha, and Zubayr represented the initial opposition to Ali's rule. They argued that Ali had failed to prioritize the prosecution of Uthman's killers and revolted to demand a new elective council. The two parties fought the Battle of the Camel in December 656, from which Ali emerged victorious. Afterwards, Mu'awiya, the long-time governor of Syria and a kinsman of Uthman, also refused to recognize Ali as caliph. He declared war on the basis of his right to seek blood-revenge for his cousin. The two parties fought the Battle of Siffin in July 657, which ended in a stalemate and arbitration.

This arbitration was resented by the Kharijites, who declared Ali, Mu'awiya, and their followers infidels. They launched a rebellion but it was suppressed by Ali at the Battle of Nahrawan. Soon after, Mu'awiya's ally Amr ibn al-As seized control of Egypt. In 661, Ali was assassinated by a Kharijite. After Ali's death, his eldest son Hasan was proclaimed in Kufa as his successor. After Mu'awiya and his army marched on Kufa, Hasan concluded a peace treaty, acknowledging the rule of Mu'awiya, which marked the beginning of the Umayyad Caliphate.

== Background ==
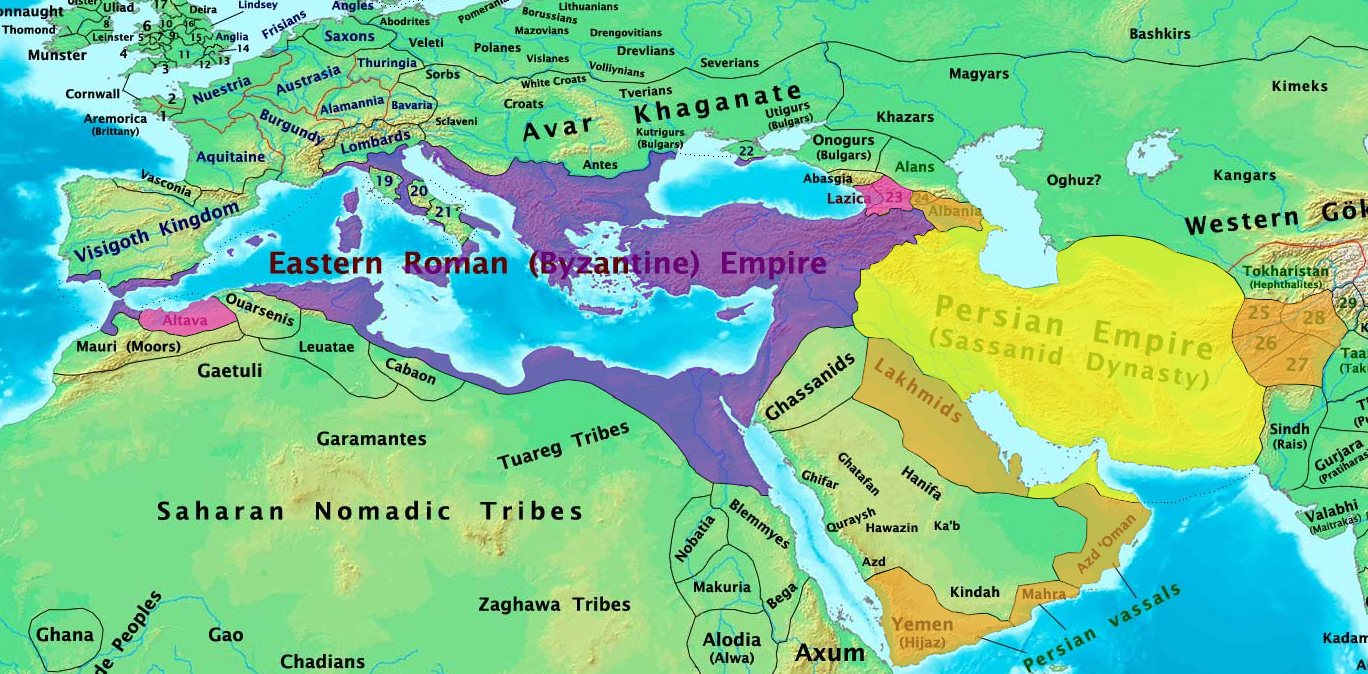
Byzantine Empire and Sasanian Empire, 600 CE

Following Muhammad's death in 632, Abu Bakr became the leader of the Muslim community. After reasserting Muslim control over the dissident tribes of Arabia, he sent armies to fight against the empires of Byzantium and Sasanian Persia, initiating a wave of conquests which were continued by his successor Umar (r. 634–644). These battles brought about the near-total collapse of the Sasanians, and restricted the Byzantine Empire to Anatolia, North Africa, and its holdings in Europe. The conquests brought Muslims bounteous revenue and lands. In Iraq, the lands of the Persian crown and aristocracy were now in Muslim hands. These became state-administered communal property. The revenue was distributed among the conquering troops, who settled in Iraq. Umar also left provincial administration to regional governors, who ruled with considerable autonomy. Provincial surplus was spent on the Muslim settlers of the conquered territories rather than forwarded to the capital at Medina.

Uthman succeeded Umar upon the latter's assassination by a slave in 644. The new caliph's policies elicited discontent among the Muslim elite as well as accusations of nepotism. He began centralizing power by relying on his Umayyad relatives, who had long opposed Muhammad before converting to Islam in 630. His favor toward relatives was to the exclusion of other members of the Quraysh, (Note: Grouping of the Meccan clans to which Muhammad and the caliphs, including Uthman, belonged.) who had enjoyed significant authority during the reign of his two predecessors. He appointed his kinsmen to nearly all of the important provincial governorships. Although Uthman continued Muslim expansion in Persia and Egypt, these conquests came to a halt by the latter half of his reign. The influx of spoils slowed, magnifying economic issues that had previously been tempered by incoming revenue. This was coupled with the antipathy of the Arab nomads towards central authority, which had hitherto been superseded by the continued war effort. The continued migration of Arab tribes from the Peninsula to the conquered territories also resulted in reduced payments from the revenue of the lands, which led to resentment among the earlier settlers. Early settlers also saw their status threatened by land grants in the conquered territories to prominent Qurayshites like Talha ibn Ubayd Allah and Zubayr ibn al-Awwam, as well as land acquisitions by late-arriving tribal chiefs, such as Al-Ash'ath ibn Qays. These chiefs were given this territory in exchange for their lands in Arabia. Furthermore, Uthman took control of the crown lands of Iraq as state assets and demanded that the provincial surplus be forwarded to the caliph. This interference in provincial affairs brought about widespread opposition to his rule, especially from Iraq and Egypt, where the majority of the conquering armies had settled.

Encouraged by disaffected Muslim elites in Medina, the provincial opposition subsequently broadened into open rebellion. Dissidents from Egypt and Iraq marched on Medina, killing the caliph in June 656. Ali, Muhammad's cousin and son-in-law, was subsequently recognized caliph.

== Battle of the Camel ==
Aisha, Talha, and Zubayr opposed Ali's succession and gathered in Mecca, where they demanded vengeance for Uthman's death and the election of a new caliph, presumably Talha. The rebels raised an army and captured Basra from Ali's governor, inflicting heavy casualties on his men, with the intention of strengthening their position. Ali sent his son Hasan to mobilize troops in Kufa. After Ali arrived in Kufa himself, the combined army marched to Basra.

The two armies met outside Basra. After three days of failed negotiations, the battle began in the afternoon of 8 December 656 and lasted until the evening. Zubayr left the field without fighting. His withdrawal may have been regarded as dishonorable, as he had left his fellow Muslims behind in a civil war he had helped initiate. He was pursued and killed shortly thereafter by Amr ibn Jarmuz, a man from the troops of al-Ahnaf bin Qays, a chief of the Banu Sa'd who had remained on the sidelines of the battle. Talha was killed by Marwan ibn al-Hakam, who was a kinsman and former secretary of Uthman, and a member of the Umayyad clan.

With the deaths of Talha and Zubayr, the fate of the battle was sealed in favor of Ali. However, the fight continued until Ali's troops succeeded in killing Aisha's camel, which her forces had rallied around. From this camel, the battle received its name. After admonishing Aisha, Ali sent her back to Medina, escorted by her brother. Ali also announced a public pardon and set the prisoners free. This pardon was also extended to high-profile rebels, including Marwan, who soon joined with his Umayyad kinsman Mu'awiya ibn Abi Sufyan, the long-time governor of Greater Syria, as a senior advisor.

== Battle of Siffin ==
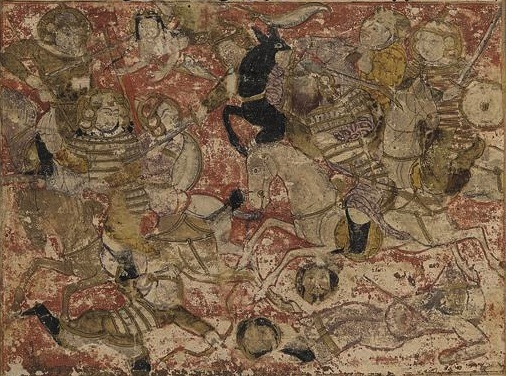
Combat between the forces of Ali and Mu'awiya during the Battle of Siffin, from the Tarikhnama

Shortly after assuming power, Ali dismissed most governors whom he considered corrupt, including Mu'awiya, Uthman's cousin. Mu'awiya refused to step down and informed Ali through a representative that he would recognize Ali as caliph in exchange for the continued governorship of Syria, and possibly the annexation of Egypt. Ali rejected this proposal.

In response, Mu'awiya declared war on Ali on behalf of the Syrians, demanding vengeance for Uthman's death. The governor of Syria aimed to depose Ali and establish a new council in Syria to appoint the next caliph, who would presumably be Mu'awiya himself. Ali responded by letter that Mu'awiya was welcome to bring his case to Ali's court of justice, asking him to offer any evidence that would incriminate Ali in the murder of Uthman. Ali also challenged Mu'awiya to name any Syrian who would qualify for a new council.

Ali called a council of Islamic ruling elite which urged him to fight Mu'awiya. The two armies met at Siffin, west of the Euphrates, in 657 CE. There, the two sides negotiated for weeks. Notably, Mu'awiya repeated his proposition to recognize Ali in return for Syria, which was again rejected. In turn, Ali challenged Mu'awiya to a one-on-one duel to settle the matters and avoid the bloodshed. This offer was declined by Mu'awiya. The negotiations ceased without success on 18 July 657 and the two sides prepared for the battle. Fighting began on Wednesday, 26 July, and lasted for three or four days. By the final day, the balance had shifted in Ali's favor. When Mu'awiya was informed his army could not win, he decided to appeal to the Quran for arbitration. Before noon, Syrians raised copies of the book on their lances, shouting, "Let the book of God be the judge between us." Although Ali was suspicious of this appeal, his forces ceased fighting. Compelled by strong peace sentiments in his army and threats of mutiny, Ali accepted the proposal for arbitration.

=== Arbitration ===
The majority Kufans in Ali's army, who preferred autonomy, urged for the reportedly neutral Abu Musa al-Ashari as their representative. Ali considered Abu Musa politically naive but appointed him despite these reservations. In an agreement on 2 August, 657 CE, Abu Musa represented Ali's army while Mu'awiya's chief adviser, Amr ibn al-As, represented the other side. The two representatives committed to adhere to the Quran and Sunnah, and to save the Muslim community from war and division.

The two arbitrators met together, first at Dumat al-Jandal and then at Udhruh, and the proceedings likely lasted until mid-April 658 CE. At Dumat al-Jandal, the arbitrators reached the verdict that Uthman had been killed wrongfully and that Mu'awiya had the right to seek revenge. According to Madelung, this verdict was political rather than judicial, and a blunder of the naive Abu Musa. The verdict strengthened the Syrians' support for Mu'awiya and weakened the position of Ali as caliph.

The second meeting at Udhruh likely broke up in disarray when Amr broke his earlier agreement with Abu Musa. The Kufan delegation reacted furiously to Abu Musa's concessions, and the erstwhile arbitrator fled to Mecca in disgrace. Conversely, Amr was received victoriously by Mu'awiya on his return to Syria. After the conclusion of the arbitration in 659 CE, the Syrians pledged their allegiance to Mu'awiya as the next caliph. Ali denounced the conduct of the two arbitrators as contrary to the Quran and began to organize a new expedition to Syria.

=== Battle of Nahrawan ===
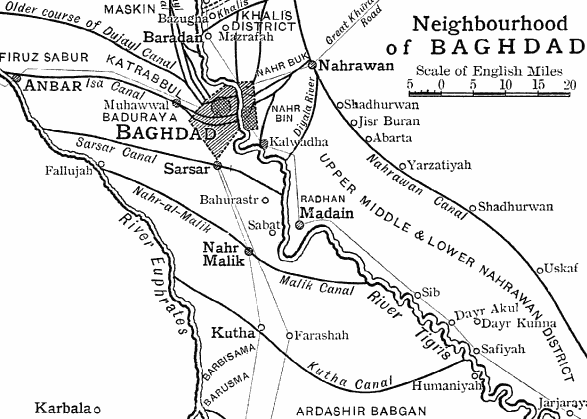
The Nahrawan Canal ran parallel to the east bank of the Tigris.

Following the Battle of Siffin, a group separated from Ali when he agreed to settle the dispute with Mu'awiya through arbitration, a move considered by the group as against the Quran. Most of them had pressured Ali to accept the arbitration, but subsequently reversed course and declared that the right to judgment belonged to God alone. While Ali largely succeeded in regaining their support, the remaining opponents of arbitration gathered in Nahrawan, on the east bank of the Tigris. Due to their exodus, this group became known as the Kharijites, from the Arabic for "to go out" or "to rise in revolt".

The Kharijites elected Abd Allah ibn Wahb al-Rasibi as their new caliph. They denounced Ali's leadership, and declared him and his followers, as well as Mu'awiya and the Syrians, to be infidels. They also declared the shedding blood of such infidels to be licit. The Kharijites then began interrogating civilians about their views on Uthman and Ali, executing those who did not share their views. In one notable incident, the Kharijites reportedly disemboweled a farmer's pregnant wife, cutting out and killing her unborn infant, before beheading the farmer. Ali received the news of the Kharijites' violence and moved to Nahrawan with his army. There, he asked the Kharijites to surrender the murderers and return to their families. The Kharijites however, responded defiantly that they were collectively responsible for the murders. After multiple failed attempts at de-escalation, Ali announced an amnesty (that did not apply to murderers) and barred his army from commencing hostilities. The remaining Kharijites, estimated at 2,800, attacked and were vanquished by the vastly superior army of Ali. The injured, estimated at 400, were pardoned by Ali.

== Umayyad intervention in Egypt ==
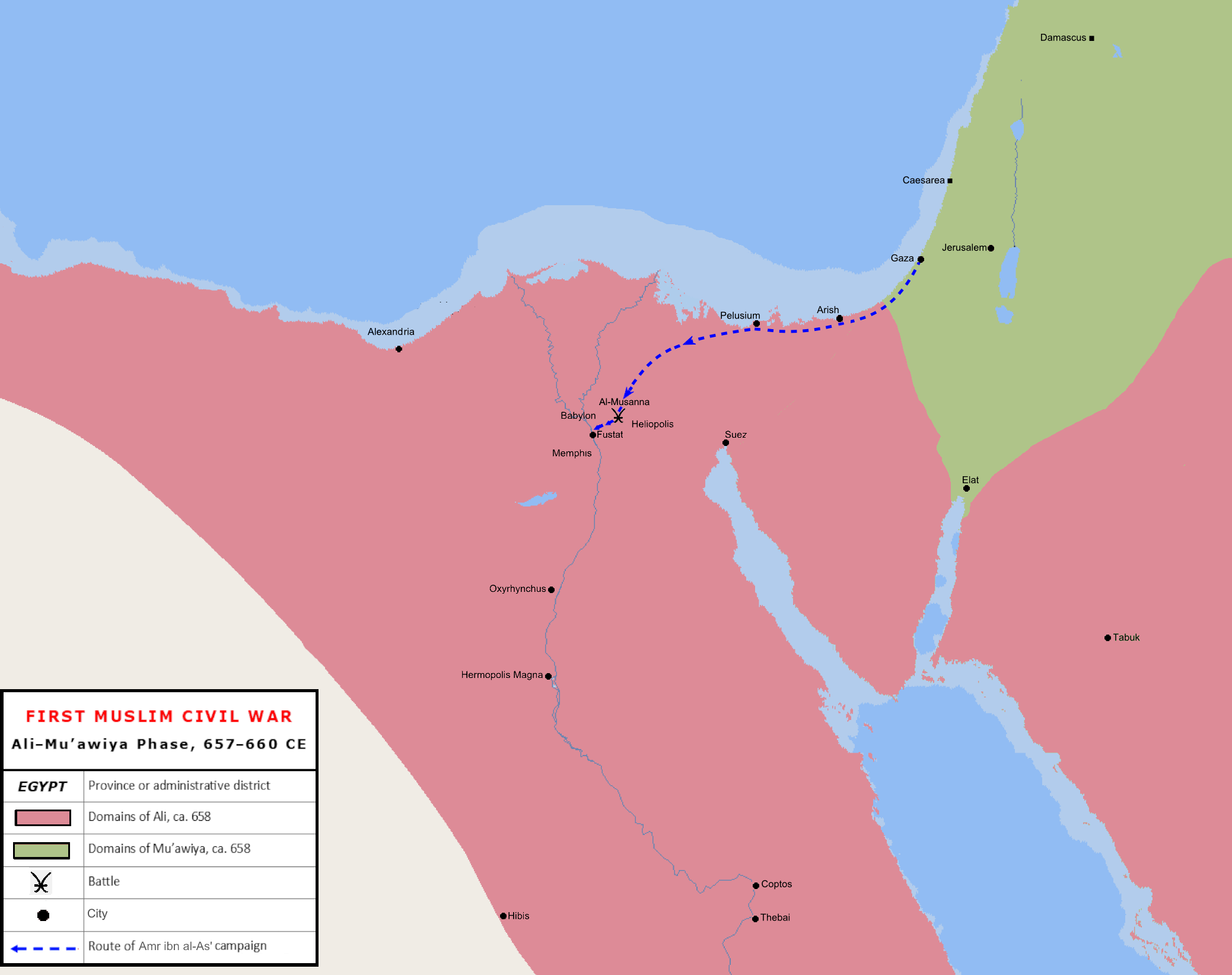
The route of the Umayyad army during the Egyptian campaign

Egypt became a major source of instability during the First Fitna, as the province was divided between supporters of Ali and partisans of Uthman who demanded retribution for his killing. After Qays ibn Sa'd had pursued a policy of neutrality toward the Uthmanid opposition, he was replaced by Muhammad ibn Abi Bakr in 657. Muhammad abandoned Qays's conciliatory policy and demanded that the opposition pledge allegiance to Ali or leave Egypt, prompting an uprising under Mu'awiya ibn Hudayj. His attempts to suppress the revolt failed, and Ali subsequently dispatched Malik al-Ashtar to take command of the province. Al-Ashtar died after being poisoned at Qulzum, an act attributed by later sources to Mu'awiya, leaving Muhammad without effective military support.

In mid-658, Mu'awiya I intervened directly in Egypt, sending approximately 6,000 Syrian troops under Amr ibn al-As to support the local Uthmanids and recover the province. Muhammad ibn Abi Bakr could muster only about 2,500 troops. The Syrian forces were joined by Uthmanid supporters under Mu'awiya ibn Hudayj, while Amr also succeeded in winning over elements of the Yemeni tribes in Egypt.

The opposing forces met at the Battle of al-Musanna between Heliopolis and Fustat. The Egyptian loyalists were defeated and their commander Kinana ibn Bishr al-Tujibi was killed. Muhammad ibn Abi Bakr fled but was captured and executed by Mu'awiya ibn Hudayj. Amr ibn al-As was subsequently reinstated as governor, bringing Egypt under Mu'awiya's control. The loss of Egypt deprived Ali of one of his wealthiest provinces and significantly weakened his position in the conflict.

== Hejaz and Yemen campaign ==
Following the Umayyad annexation of Egypt in 658, Mu'awiya turned his attention to the territories in the Hejaz and Yemen that remained under the control of Ali. Amr ibn al-As provided Busr ibn Abi Artat with 3,000 Syrian troops for an expedition against Ali's territories. The Qaysi nobility warned Mu'awiya that Busr might seek revenge against the Qaysi tribesmen accompanying him, leading Mu'awiya to strip Busr of authority over them. At Deir Murran, Busr consequently detached 400 troops and continued with approximately 2,600 men.

Busr first entered Medina, where he encountered no military resistance. Abu Ayyub al-Ansari, Ali's governor of the city, fled to Kufa, while Busr secured pledges of allegiance to Mu'awiya from the city's notables and demolished the houses of several of Ali's supporters, including Abu Ayyub's. He then proceeded to Mecca, where Ali's governor Qutham ibn Abbas also fled. Busr secured pledges of allegiance to Mu'awiya from the inhabitants before continuing southward.

In the territory of the Kinana, Busr encountered Abd al-Rahman and Qutham, the young sons of Ali's governor of Yemen, Ubayd Allah ibn Abbas, and executed them. In 660, Busr then continued his expedition into Yemen, where he attacked Ali's supporters and executed several prominent local figures. At Najran, he ordered the execution of Abd Allah ibn Abd al-Madan, together with his brother and son.

Busr attacked the Hamdan in the region of Shibam, killing Ali's supporters and capturing women from the tribe. He subsequently advanced on Sana'a, where Ali's deputy Amr ibn Araka al-Thaqafi was killed along with other inhabitants. He also campaigned in Hadhramaut, where he executed Abd Allah ibn Thawaba after being invited into the region by Wa'il ibn Hujr.

The violence accompanying Busr's expedition prompted Ali to dispatch Jariya ibn Qudama and Wahb ibn Masud with a relief force. Busr withdrew from Yemen before engaging the relief army, in accordance with Mu'awiya's preference to avoid heavy Syrian casualties. Jariya subsequently pursued Busr northward and restored Ali's authority in Yemen.

Jariya then proceeded to Mecca and Medina. After learning of Ali's death, he called upon the inhabitants to pledge allegiance to Hasan ibn Ali, which they eventually did. He returned to Kufa after briefly remaining in Medina.

== Hasan–Mu'awiya treaty ==
In late 660, an exchange of letters took place between Ali and Mu'awiya in which both parties agreed to cease military campaigns. According to Abu Ishaq, Mu'awiya offered Ali the choice of retaining Iraq while Mu'awiya retained Syria, thereby ending the fighting and preventing further bloodshed among the Muslims. The truce was followed by renewed Kharijite efforts to assassinate the leaders of both sides.

In January 661, while praying at the Great Mosque of Kufa, Ali was assassinated by the Kharijite Abd al-Rahman ibn Muljam. His eldest son Hasan was subsequently proclaimed caliph in Kufa. Mu'awiya quickly marched on Kufa with a large army, while Hasan's forces suffered widespread defections. These were facilitated by military commanders and tribal chiefs who had been won over to Mu'awiya's side by promises of money and offers of amnesty. Hasan was wounded in a failed attempt on his life, and his authority eventually became restricted to the area around Kufa.

Hasan subsequently concluded a peace treaty with Mu'awiya, under which he ceded the caliphate to him. The treaty provided for a general amnesty and stipulated that a council would choose the caliph after Mu'awiya's death. Mu'awiya was subsequently recognized as caliph, bringing the First Fitna to an end.

== Sources ==
- Bowering, Gerhard; Crone, Patricia; Kadi, Wadad; Mirza, Mahan; Stewart, Devin J.; Zaman, Muhammad Qasim, eds. (2013). "Ali b. Abi Talib (ca. 599–661)". The Princeton Encyclopedia of Islamic Political Thought. Princeton University Press. ISBN 978-0691134840.
- Donner, Fred M. (2010). Muhammad and the Believers, at the Origins of Islam. Harvard University Press. ISBN 978-0-674-05097-6.
- Gibbon, Edward (1906). The History of the Decline and Fall of the Roman Empire. New York: Fred de Fau and Co. Publishers.
- Glassé, Cyril, ed. (2003). The New Encyclopedia of Islam. Revised Edition of the Concise Encyclopedia of Islam. AltaMira Press. ISBN 978-0-7591-0190-6.
- Gleave, Robert M. (2008). "Ali ibn Abi Talib". Encyclopaedia of Islam, Three. Brill Online. Archived from the original on 2 April 2013.
- Holt, P. M.; Bernard Lewis (1977). Cambridge History of Islam, Vol. 1. Cambridge University Press. ISBN 0-521-29136-4.
- Lapidus, Ira (2002). A History of Islamic Societies (2nd ed.). Cambridge University Press. ISBN 978-0-521-77933-3.
- Levi Della Vida, G. (1978). "Khāridjites". In van Donzel, E.; Lewis, B.; Pellat, Ch. & Bosworth, C. E. (eds.). The Encyclopaedia of Islam, Second Edition. Volume IV: Iran–Kha. Leiden: E. J. Brill. pp. 1074–1077. ISBN 978-90-04-05745-6. OCLC 758278456.
- Kennedy, Hugh (2016) [1986]. The Prophet and the Age of the Caliphates: The Islamic Near East from the 6th to the 11th Century (Third ed.). Abingdon, Oxon and New York: Routledge. ISBN 978-1-138-78761-2.
- Lecker, M. (2012). "Ṣiffīn". In Bearman, P.; Bianquis, Th.; Bosworth, C.E.; van Donzel, E.; Heinrichs, W.P. (eds.). Encyclopaedia of Islam (2nd ed.). doi:10.1163/1573-3912_islam_SIM_7018. ISBN 978-9004161214.
- Lecker, M. (2021). "Siffin". Encyclopaedia of Islam (2nd ed.). Brill Reference Online.
- Lewis, Bernard (2002). Arabs in History. Oxford: Oxford University Press. ISBN 978-0191647161.
- Madelung, Wilferd (1997). The Succession to Muhammad: A Study of the Early Caliphate. Cambridge University Press. ISBN 0-521-64696-0.
- Mavani, Hamid (2013). Religious Authority and Political Thought in Twelver Shi'ism: From Ali to Post-Khomeini. Routledge. ISBN 978-0415624404.
- Tabatabai, Muhammad Husayn (1977). Shi'ite Islam. Translated by Nasr, Hossein. State University of New York Press. pp. 52, 53. ISBN 978-0873952729.
- Wellhausen, Julius (1901). Die religiös-politischen Oppositionsparteien im alten Islam (in German). Berlin: Weidmannsche Buchhandlung. OCLC 453206240.
- Wellhausen, Julius (1927). The Arab Kingdom and Its Fall. Translated by Margaret Graham Weir. Calcutta: University of Calcutta.
- Abbas, Hassan (2021). The Prophet's Heir: The Life of Ali ibn Abi Talib. Yale University Press. ISBN 978-0300252057.
- Hazleton, Lesley (2009). After the Prophet: The Epic Story of the Shia-Sunni Split in Islam. Knopf Doubleday Publishing Group. ISBN 978-0385532099.
- Rogerson, Barnaby (2006). The Heirs of the Prophet Muhammad: And the Roots of the Sunni-Shia Schism. Abacus. ISBN 978-0349117577.
- Bowering, Gerhard, ed. (2013). "Ali b. Abi Talib". The Princeton Encyclopedia of Islamic Political Thought. Princeton University Press. ISBN 978-0691134840.
- Jafri, S.H.M (1979). Origins and Early Development of Shia Islam. London: Longman.
- Glassé, Cyril (2001). The new encyclopedia of Islam. AltaMira Press. ISBN 978-0759101890.
- Aslan, Reza (2011). No god but God: The origins, evolution, and future of Islam. Random House. ISBN 978-0812982442.
- Momen, Moojan (1985). An introduction to Shi'i Islam. Yale University Press. ISBN 978-0853982005.
- Avi-Yonah, Michael (2001). History of Israel and the Holy Land. A&C Black. ISBN 978-0826415264.
- Nasr, Seyyed Hossein; Afsaruddin, Asma (2021). "Ali". Encyclopedia Britannica.
- Poonawala, I.K. (1982). "Ali b. Abi Taleb I. Life". Encyclopaedia Iranica (Online ed.).
- Veccia Vaglieri, L. (2021). "Ali b. Abi Talib". Encyclopaedia of Islam (2nd ed.). Brill Reference Online.
- Gleave, Robert M. (2021). "Ali b. Abi Talib". Encyclopaedia of Islam (3rd ed.). Brill Reference Online.
- Veccia Vaglieri, L. (2021b). "Al-Djamal". Encyclopaedia of Islam (2nd ed.). Brill Reference Online.
- Bodley, R.V.C. (1946). The Messenger; the Life of Mohammed. Doubleday & Company, Inc.
- Morony, M. (2021). "Al-Nahrawan". Encyclopaedia of Islam (2nd ed.). Brill Reference Online.
- Veccia Vaglieri, L. (2021c). "Al-Ashari, Abu Musa". Encyclopaedia of Islam (2nd ed.). Brill Reference Online.
- Hinds, M. (2021). "Muawiya I". Encyclopaedia of Islam (2nd ed.). Brill Reference Online.
- Gordon, Matthew S.; Robinson, Chase F.; Rowson, Everett K.; Fishbein, Michael, eds. (2018). The Works of Ibn Wāḍiḥ al-Yaʿqūbī: An English Translation. Vol. 3. Brill. ISBN 978-90-04-36416-5.
- Lev, Yaacov (2020). Administration of Justice in Medieval Egypt: From the 7th to the 12th Century. Edinburgh University Press. ISBN 978-1-4744-5926-6.
