= Caliph Ibrahim =

Caliph Ibrahim may refer to:

- Ibrahim ibn al-Walid, was an Umayyad caliph, and a son of Caliph al-Walid I. He ruled from 4 October 744 to 4 December 744.
- Ibrahim ibn Jaʿfar (died 968) better known as Al-Muttaqi was the Caliph of Baghdad during Later Abbasid period.
- Ibrahim of the Ottoman Empire, was the Sultan of the Ottoman Empire from 1640 until 1648.
- Abu Bakr al-Baghdadi, (died 2019) called Caliph by his followers since 2014.
