= Busr ibn Abi Artat =

7th century Arab military commander

Busr ibn Abi Artat بسر بن أبي أرطأة

Umayyad governor of Basra
- In office 661–662
- Monarch: Mu'awiya I
- Succeeded by: Abd Allah ibn Amir

Personal details
- Born: 620s Mecca, Hejaz, Arabia
- Died: 700s Damascus, Syria
- Children: Abd al-Rahman; Al-Walid

Military service
- Allegiance: Rashidun Caliphate (634–656); Umayyad Caliphate (656–700s)
- Years of service: 634–700s
- Commands: Field commander in North Africa (639 – early 640s); Commander in Syria & Arabia (657–661); Vanguard commander for Mu'awiya I (661); Commander on the Byzantine front (665–672)
- Battles/wars: Arab–Byzantine wars; Muslim conquest of the Levant; Muslim conquest of Egypt; Muslim conquest of the Maghreb; Expedition to Waddan; Battle of Sufetula; First Fitna; Battle of Siffin; Umayyad invansions of Egypt; Umayyad invansion of Hejaz and Yemen

Busr ibn Abi Artat al-Amiri (Note: Given name alternatively transliterated as "Bisr"; father's name also spelled simply "Artat" or "Abi Arta'ah") (Arabic: بسر بن أبي أرطأة العامري, romanized: Busr ibn Abī Arṭāt al-ʿĀmirī; 620s–c. 690–700s) was a prominent Arab commander veteran of the early Muslim conquests in Syria and North Africa. Busr became a staunch Uthmanid partisan and supporter of Mu'awiya I, the long-time governor of Syria (640s–661) and the first Umayyad caliph (661–680). During the First Fitna, he led a large-scale campaign against the supporters of Caliph Ali (r. 656–661) in Arabia, gaining the submission of Medina, Mecca and Ta'if to Mu'awiya's rival caliphate and carrying out punitive measures against the inhabitants of Yemen. His actions in Arabia, which included executing two young sons of Ali's cousin and governor of Yemen, Ubayd Allah ibn Abbas, and taking women captive from the Muslim tribe of Hamdan, were condemned as unprecedented atrocities in traditional Muslim sources, a view emphasized particularly by Shia writers.

Following Ali's death and the abdication of his son Hasan in 661, Busr was appointed governor of Basra. There he was instrumental in securing the submission of Ziyad ibn Abihi, a loyalist holdover of Ali's administration, by holding his sons as hostages. He led a number of land and sea raids against the Byzantine Empire between 662 and 672. He remained in Mu'awiya's court until the caliph's death in 680. Busr died at an old age during the reign of Abd al-Malik (r. 685–705) or al-Walid I (r. 705–715).

== Origins ==
Busr hailed from the Banu Amir ibn Lu'ayy, a clan of the Quraysh tribe's Zawahir subgroup which lived in the mountainous part of Mecca in the Hejaz (present-day Saudi Arabia). His father's name in the sources is inconsistent with some calling him 'Abi Artat' and others 'Artat'; the more authoritative sources use the former. According to the medieval historian Ibn Hazm (d. 1064), Abu Artat Umayr was Busr's grandfather, and Busr's father's name was Artat. Abu Artat's father was Uwaymir ibn Imran. Busr was born in Mecca during the last decade preceding the Hijrah (the emigration of the Islamic prophet Muhammad from Mecca to Medina in 622 and beginning of the Islamic calendar) or in c. 625.

The Islamic traditional sources are divided about the status of Busr as one of the sahaba (companions of Muhammad; singular: sahabi). Sources from Syria and a number of authorities on transmitters of hadiths (traditions and sayings attributed to Muhammad), including al-Daraqutni (d. 995), consider Busr to be a sahabi and a transmitter of hadith. Shia Muslim scholars and a number of Sunni Muslim sources, including Yahya ibn Ma'in, reject Busr's sahabi status. Busr's kunya (patronymic) was Abu Abd al-Rahman (father of Abd al-Rahman).

== Role in the conquests of Syria and North Africa ==
Busr participated in the Muslim conquest of Syria, arriving with the army of Khalid ibn al-Walid in 634. According to the historian al-Baladhuri (d. 892), after Khalid raided the Ghassanid allies of Byzantium at Marj Rahit on 24 April 634, he dispatched Busr and Habib ibn Maslama al-Fihri to raid the villages of the Ghouta oasis surrounding Damascus.

Busr took part in the Muslim conquest of Egypt in the army of Amr ibn al-As in 639–640, and continued to fight under Amr's command during the westward expeditions along the coast of North Africa. According to the historians Ibn Abd al-Hakam (d. 871) and al-Bakri (d. 1094), in 643/44, while Amr besieged the port city of Tripoli in northwestern modern Libya, he dispatched Busr to conquer the Waddan oasis, where he exacted an annual tribute of 360 slaves. Al-Ya'qubi (d. 898) notes that Busr also secured capitulation terms with the inhabitants of the Fezzan region south of Waddan during the same expedition. The inhabitants of Waddan later discontinued the tribute until reinstating it following Uqba ibn Nafi's campaign against the oasis in 666/67.

In recognition of his bravery on the battlefield, Busr received a du'a (prayer of supplication) and gifts from Caliph Umar (r. 634–644). According to an account cited by al-Baladhuri, Busr was rewarded with 200 dinars by Umar "because he won a victory", while the version quoted by the modern author Malik Abdulazeez Al-Mubarak has Umar write to Amr: "Give 200 gold dinars to those who witnessed the pledge of Ridwān, to Khārijah b. Ḥudhāfah for his hospitality and to Bisr [b]. Abī Arṭ'ah [sic] for his courage." In 647/48, 648/49 or 649/50 Umar's successor Caliph Uthman (r. 644–656) dispatched Busr, along with numerous other Arab Muslim notables, as reinforcements to Abd Allah ibn Sa'd, Amr's replacement as governor of Egypt, for raids against the Byzantine Exarchate of Africa (called Ifriqiya by the early Muslims).

== Military service under Mu'awiya ==
During the First Fitna (656–661), Busr was a staunch supporter of the Umayyad governor of Syria, Mu'awiya ibn Abi Sufyan, against Caliph Ali (r. 656–661). He won over to Mu'awiya's side the prominent Kindite leader Shurahbil ibn Simt. In 657, Busr fought in Mu'awiya's army against the forces of Ali at the Battle of Siffin. The battle ended in a stalemate and an agreement by Ali and Mu'awiya to arbitrate the conflict; Busr was the sole member of Mu'awiya's party to strongly oppose the decision to arbitrate. Busr soon after appears as one of the commanders of anti-Alid mutineers in Egypt in 658, alongside Mu'awiya ibn Hudayj al-Kindi and Maslama ibn Mukhallad al-Ansari. Ali's governor in Egypt, Qays ibn Sa'd, described Busr as one of the "lions of the Arabs", by dint of his courage. Egypt ultimately fell to Mu'awiya's loyalists during a campaign by Amr in the summer of 658.

=== Subjugation of Arabia ===
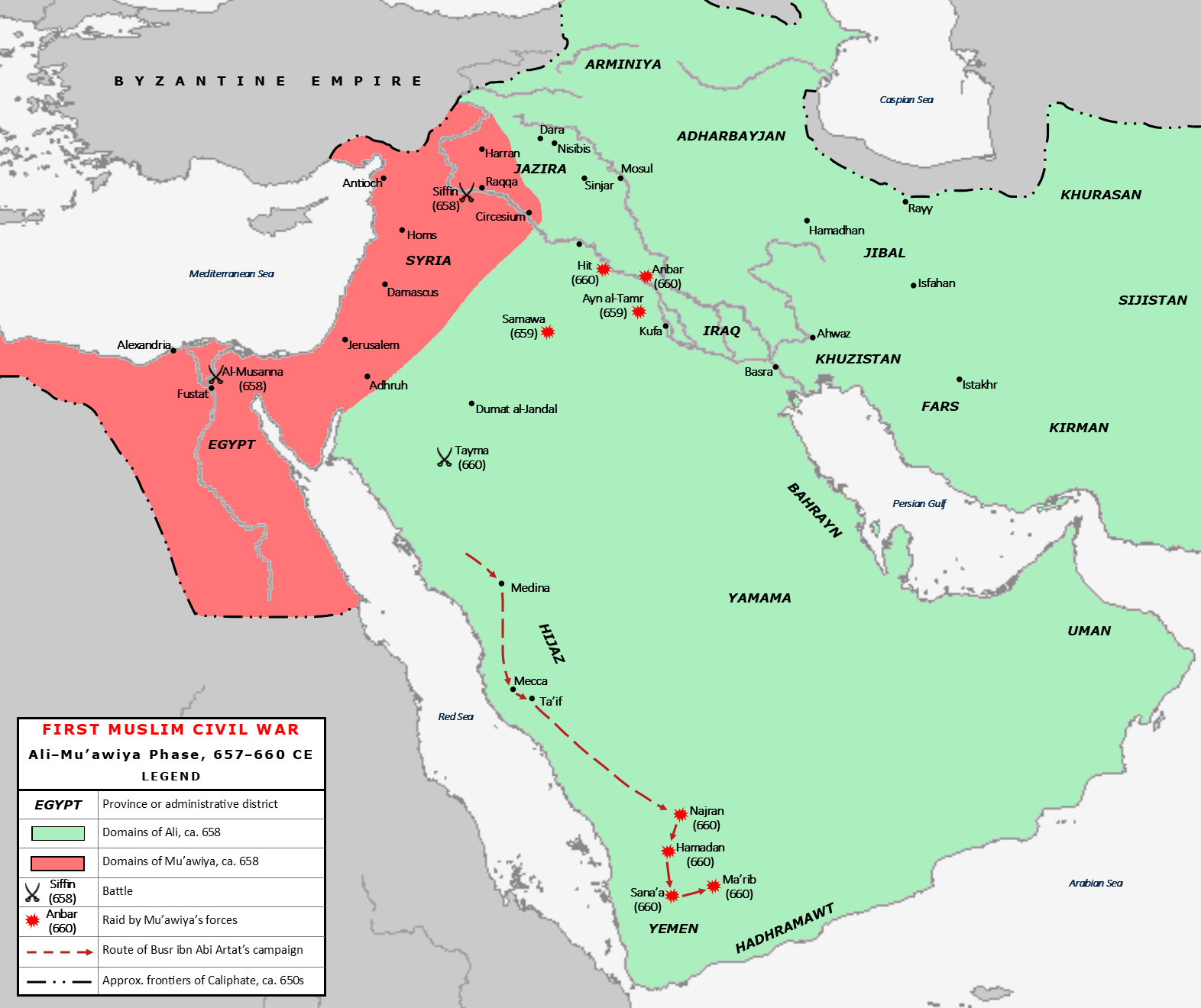
Map of the First Muslim Civil War, showing the territories controlled by Caliph Ali (green) and Mu'awiya ibn Abi Sufyan (pink) c. 658. Busr's Arabia campaign is indicated by the red-dashed line

Hostilities resumed between Mu'awiya and Ali following the collapse of the arbitration talks. While Amr ibn al-As was sent to wrest control of Egypt, Mu'awiya dispatched his lieutenant commanders on raids against Ali's territory in Iraq and Arabia. In late 660, Mu'awiya appointed Busr to subjugate the Hejaz and Yemen (south Arabia). A previous attempt by Mu'awiya to secure oaths of allegiance from the Quraysh of Mecca had failed under the command of Yazid ibn Shajara earlier in 660. According to the orientalist Henri Lammens, Busr was "perhaps the most striking figure among the lieutenants" of Mu'awiya, "a typical Bedouin of the old school, utterly impervious to pity, if Shi'i [sic] tradition has not exaggerated the details of the portrait of this fiery opponent of Ali". The historian Wilferd Madelung holds Busr was chosen to lead the campaign because he was not "plagued" by the "scruples" of Yazid ibn Shajara, who had been careful not to spill blood in the Islamic city of Mecca. Lammens states that during the campaign Busr "displayed a loyalty to the Umayyads, which was only surpassed later" by Muslim ibn Uqba and al-Hajjaj ibn Yusuf. Although Sunni sources generally avoid the details of Busr's activities, traditional and modern Shia sources provide lengthy descriptions of what they deem "his atrocities, which were, they believe, ordered by Mu'awiya", according to the historian Isaac Hasson.

Busr was provided 3,000 Syrian soldiers by Amr ibn al-As. In response to requests by nobles from the Qays tribal confederation, concerned that Busr would take vengeance on the Qays for the slaying of members of the Fihr clan and Kinana tribe (both affiliated with the Quraysh) by the Qaysi Banu Sulaym during Muhammad's capture of Mecca in 630, Mu'awiya stripped Busr of authority over the Qaysi tribesmen under his command. During a review of the troops at Dayr Murran, outside of Damascus, Busr dismissed 400 soldiers from the impending campaign and proceeded with the remaining 2,600.

==== Capitulation of the Hejaz ====
On his way to his first major target, Medina, the former capital of the Caliphate before Ali's relocation of the capital to Kufa in Iraq, Busr halted at every watering place en route and requisitioned the camels of the local tribesmen, which he then had his soldiers ride to preserve the energy of their war horses. When Busr appeared outside of Medina, the city's governor Abu Ayyub al-Ansari fled for Kufa. Busr did not encounter resistance as he entered the city and issued a condemnatory speech against Medina's traditional elite, the Ansar (early converts and allies of Muhammad). He had the homes of Ali's allies who fled the city, including Abu Ayyub, demolished, obtained pledges of allegiance to Mu'awiya's caliphate from the city's notables and pardoned its inhabitants.

After a stay of a few days in Medina, Busr proceeded toward Mecca, where Ali's governor Qutham ibn Abbas fled along with a large number of the city's inhabitants. He executed several descendants of Abu Lahab, possibly due to their belonging to Ali's clan, the Banu Hashim, whom Mu'awiya held collectively culpable for the slaying of his distant kinsman, Ali's predecessor Uthman, in 656. Busr located a companion of Muhammad and Ali's representative at the arbitration talks, Abu Musa al-Ash'ari, who had gone into hiding in Mecca, and pardoned him. Busr proceeded to pray at the Ka'aba and then demanded oaths of allegiance to Mu'awiya from Mecca's inhabitants, all of whom obliged with the exception of Mu'awiya's distant kinsman, Sa'id ibn al-As. Qutham may have retaken control of Mecca following Busr's exit.

From Mecca Busr entered Ta'if, where one of its notables, al-Mughira ibn Shu'ba, greeted Busr and persuaded him not to assault the city's inhabitants, the Banu Thaqif. According to an account by the historian Ibn A'tham, the representatives of the Thaqif informed Busr that he had no authority over them as they were core clan of the Qays. Busr spared the inhabitants. From Ta'if, he dispatched troops against Ali's sympathizers in Tabala to the south, but the inhabitants of the town were ultimately pardoned. After Busr's exit from Ta'if, he entered the tribal territory of the Kinana, where he encountered Abd al-Rahman and Qutham, two young sons of Ali's cousin and his governor in Yemen, Ubayd Allah ibn Abbas, who had been entrusted to the care of their maternal Kinana kinsmen. According to another account, Busr encountered the two sons in a caravan in Yemen. Abd al-Rahman and Qutham were executed by Busr.

==== Campaigns in Yemen and withdrawal ====
While Mu'awiya had imposed restrictions on Busr's operational conduct in the cities of the Hejaz, he allowed him a free hand against the people of Yemen. Upon entering southern Arabia, Busr executed the ascetic Ka'b ibn Abda Dhi'l-Habaka al-Nahdi for his past criticism of Uthman. He then entered Najran where he ordered the executions of the chieftain of the Banu al-Harith and the leader of an embassy to Muhammad, Abd Allah ibn Abd al-Madan, and the latter's brother and son, Yazid and Malik respectively. Busr proceeded into Yemen where he first assaulted the Arhab clan of the Hamdan tribe and killed a number of Ali's supporters, including Abu Karib, a Hamdan chief. Tribesmen of the Hamdan then took up position in the mountain of Shibam and defied Busr, who bypassed the mountain, feigning a withdrawal; once the tribesmen returned to their villages, Busr attacked them, slayed the men and captured the women. The attack represented the first occurrence in Islamic history where Muslim women were taken captive by a Muslim army.

Ali's two governors in Yemen, Ubayd Allah ibn Abbas and Sa'id ibn Nimran, fled for Kufa following token resistance by Sa'id against Busr's advance. Ubayd Allah's deputy in Sana'a, Amr ibn Araka al-Thaqafi, defended the city but was killed by Busr's forces along with numerous other inhabitants. While in Sana'a, Busr killed all but one member of a delegation of townsmen from Ma'rib who had offered to submit to Mu'awiya's rule; the sole survivor was spared to inform the people of Ma'rib of the slayings. Busr moved against Jayshan where support for Ali was strong, engaged and overpowered its defenders, many of whom were killed while others withdrew into their forts, prompting Busr to withdraw to Sana'a. According to the Zaydi Shia scholar Abu Ishaq Ibrahim al-Thaqafi (d. 896), Busr killed 30,000 men during his campaign in Arabia, an exaggerated figure according to Madelung.

Busr ended his campaign in Hadhramawt and withdrew to Syria upon the approach of a Kufan relief army sent by Ali under the command of Jariya ibn Qudama. In Madelung's opinion, Busr did not confront the relief army because of "Mu'awiya's instructions rather than his own preference", the purpose of the campaign having been to intimidate the population of Arabia into submission with minimum Syrian casualties, rather than to conquer and permanently occupy any part of the region. Busr retreated through central Arabia to avoid Ali's relief troops in the Hejaz. There he encountered, but did not challenge, the Banu Tamim nomads, who seized part of his loot. He entered the Yamama region where he intended to punish the Hanifa tribe for their neutrality in the civil war (Busr's entry into the Yamama may have occurred following Ali's assassination in January). He spared the tribesmen but took captive the son of their deceased chieftain Mujja'a ibn Murara and continued to Syria where Mu'awiya released and appointed Mujja'a's son chieftain of the Hanifa.

=== Operations in Iraq ===
Busr was appointed to the vanguard of Mu'awiya's army, which the caliph led in person, during the campaign to wrest control of Kufa from Ali's son and successor al-Hasan. The latter abdicated and left Kufa for Medina, after which Busr was appointed governor of Basra, one of the main garrison cities and administrative centers of Iraq, in November 661. His stay in office, during which "he established a dictatorial regime" according to Lammens, was about six months according to the historian al-Mada'ini (d. 843). During his governorship, he arrested Abd al-Rahman, Ubayd Allah, and Abbad, three sons of Ziyad ibn Abihi, Ali's governor in Fars (southwestern Iran), who had refused to recognize Mu'awiya's caliphate and held out in the fortress of Istakhr. Busr intended to kill them if Ziyad did not to submit to Mu'awiya's rule, but the boys were released following the intervention of Ziyad's step-brother Abu Bakra Nufay who petitioned Mu'awiya. Ziyad then recognized Mu'awiya's authority—as a result of Busr's "drastic action" against Ziyad's sons according to Lammens.

=== Raids against the Byzantines ===
Busr led a number of campaigns against the Byzantine Empire after his stint in Basra. In the chronicle of Agapius of Hierapolis (d. 942), Busr defeated a large Byzantine army, killed several patricians and took numerous captives in 662/663. The same source holds Busr or Abd al-Rahman (son of Khalid ibn al-Walid) commanded a naval campaign against the Byzantines that year alongside Abd al-Malik ibn Marwan, the future Umayyad caliph. According to Agapius and the traditional Islamic sources, Busr led a winter raid which reached Constantinople in 662/63 or 663/64, forcing the Byzantine troops to withdraw into the city. Agapius and Theophanes the Confessor (d. 818; who calls him "Bousour") report Busr led raids into the Empire in 666/67 and 667/68, the latter of which targeted the Hexapolis coast according to Theophanes and which resulted in many captives according to Agapius. He led a winter raid into the Empire in 671 or 672.

== Later life and death ==
At some point after 670 Busr disappears from the political scene but may have lived at Mu'awiya's Damascus court until the caliph's death in 680. Shia sources claim Busr had become insane during his later years. A number of traditional Muslim sources hold that Busr died in Medina during Abd al-Malik's reign (685–705). Ibn Hajar al-Asqalani (d. 1449) places his death in Damascus in 86 AH (705 CE). Other traditional sources name him as a participant in a military expedition in North Africa during the reign of Abd al-Malik's successor al-Walid I (705–715). In any case "he lived to a great age", according to Lammens. A seventh-generation descendant of Busr, Abu Abd al-Malik Ahmad ibn Ibrahim al-Busri al-Qurashi (d. 902), was a Damascene transmitter of traditions about the Islamic prophet Muhammad. (Note: The full name and genealogy of Abu Abd al-Malik is Ahmad ibn Ibrahim ibn Muhammad ibn Abd Allah ibn Bakkar ibn Abd al-Malik ibn al-Walid ibn Busr ibn Abi Artat al-Qurashi al-Amiri.)

== Bibliography ==
- Al-Mubarak, Malik Abdulazeez (October 1997). Warfare in Early Islam (PDF) (Thesis). University of Glasgow.
- Biesterfeldt, Hinrich; Günther, Sebastian (2018). The Works of Ibn Wāḍiḥ al-Yaʿqūbī (Volume 3): An English Translation. Leiden: Brill. ISBN 978-90-04-35621-4.
- Elad, Amikam (2003). "The Beginnings of Historical Writing by the Arabs: The Earliest Syrian Writers on the Arab Conquests". Jerusalem Studies in Arabic and Islam. 28: 65–102.
- Brockett, Adrian, ed. (1997). The History of al-Ṭabarī, Volume XVI: The Community Divided: The Caliphate of ʿAlī I, A.D. 656–657/A.H. 35–36. SUNY Series in Near Eastern Studies. Albany, New York: State University of New York Press. ISBN 978-0-7914-2391-2.
- Hawting, G. R., ed. (1996). The History of al-Ṭabarī, Volume XVII: The First Civil War: From the Battle of Siffīn to the Death of ʿAlī, A.D. 656–661/A.H. 36–40. SUNY Series in Near Eastern Studies. Albany, New York: State University of New York Press. ISBN 978-0-7914-2393-6.
- Hitti, Philip Khuri (1916). The Origins of the Islamic State, Being a Translation from the Arabic, Accompanied with Annotations, Geographic and Historic Notes of the Kitâb Fitûh al-Buldân of al-Imâm Abu-l Abbâs Ahmad Ibn-Jâbir al-Balâdhuri, Volume 1. New York and London: Columbia University & Longman, Green & Co. OCLC 958738109.
- Jankowiak, Marek (2013). "The First Arab Siege of Constantinople". In Zuckerman, Constantin (ed.). Travaux et mémoires, Vol. 17: Constructing the Seventh Century. Paris: Association des Amis du Centre d’Histoire et Civilisation de Byzance. pp. 237–320. OCLC 243890056.
- Lammens, H. (1960). "Busr". In Gibb, H. A. R.; Kramers, J. H.; Lévi-Provençal, E.; Schacht, J.; Lewis, B. & Pellat, Ch. (eds.). The Encyclopaedia of Islam, Second Edition. Volume I: A–B. Leiden: E. J. Brill. pp. 1343–1344. OCLC 495469456.
- Lévi-Provençal, E. (1960). "Abu Ayyub al-Ansari". In Gibb, H. A. R.; Kramers, J. H.; Lévi-Provençal, E.; Schacht, J.; Lewis, B. & Pellat, Ch. (eds.). The Encyclopaedia of Islam, Second Edition. Volume I: A–B. Leiden: E. J. Brill. pp. 108–109. OCLC 495469456.
- Madelung, Wilferd (1997). The Succession to Muhammad: A Study of the Early Caliphate. Cambridge: Cambridge University Press. ISBN 0-521-56181-7.
- Morony, Michael G., ed. (1987). The History of al-Ṭabarī, Volume XVIII: Between Civil Wars: The Caliphate of Muʿāwiyah, 661–680 A.D./A.H. 40–60. SUNY Series in Near Eastern Studies. Albany, New York: State University of New York Press. ISBN 978-0-87395-933-9.
- Murgotten, Francis Clark (1924). The Origins of the Islamic State, Being a Translation from the Arabic, Accompanied with Annotations, Geographic and Historic Notes of the Kitâb Fitûh al-Buldân of al-Imâm Abu-l Abbâs Ahmad Ibn-Jâbir al-Balâdhuri, Part 2. New York and London: Columbia University & Longman, Green & Co.
- Thiry, Jacques (1995). Le Sahara Libyen dans l'Afrique du Nord Médiévale. Leuven, Belgium: Peeters Publishers. ISBN 90-6831-739-3.
