= Dayr Murran =

Syrian monastery and village

Dayr Murrān was a monastery and village in the western outskirts of Damascus, on the lower slopes of Mount Qasioun, that had been a favored seasonal residence of the Umayyad and Abbasid caliphs in the 7th, 8th and 9th centuries. Its exact location has not been identified.

== Location and etymology ==
The exact location of Dayr Murran has not been identified, though the medieval sources indicate it was situated on the lower slopes of Mount Qasioun near the Bab al-Faradis gate of Damascus. It overlooked the orchards of the Ghouta plain that surrounded the city. The village was named after the large Christian monastery located within it, though its etymology is obscure. It translates in Arabic as the "ash-tree monastery", which historian Dominique Sourdel considered a questionable name. He also doubts that the name has Syriac roots. Dayr Murran was known for its view of the saffron fields below and for containing abundant walled gardens and orchards. Its monastery was decorated with numerous mosaics.

== History ==
Dayr Murran was utilized by the Umayyad caliphs as a residence where they could be entertained while overseeing their capital Damascus. As early as 660, while the Umayyad Mu'awiya I was governor of Syria, his lieutenant Busr ibn Abi Artat mobilized his forces at Dayr Murran for the conquest of Mecca and Medina from Caliph Ali's control. The future caliph Yazid I (r. 680–683) made improvements to its irrigation systems and was staying there before being dispatched to the Byzantine front in Anatolia by his father, Mu'awiya I. Later, Caliph Abd al-Malik and his entourage spent their springs there and at Jabiyah, while his son Caliph al-Walid I died there. Caliph al-Walid II established his principal residence in Dayr Murran.

Following the demise of the Umayyads in 750, their Abbasid successors or their representatives lived in or visited the village. Among the caliphs who spent time there were Harun al-Rashid, al-Ma'mun and al-Mu'tasim. When Caliph al-Wathiq dispatched Raja ibn Ayyub to put down a Qaysi tribal revolt in Damascus, Raja used Dayr Murran as his headquarters.

== Bibliography ==
- Anderson, Glaire D. (2013). The Islamic Villa in Early Medieval Iberia: Architecture and Court Culture in Umayyad Cordoba. Ashgate Publishing. ISBN 978-1-4094-4943-0.
- Kennedy, Hugh (2004). The Prophet and the Age of the Caliphates: The Islamic Near East from the 6th to the 11th Century (Second ed.). Harlow: Longman. ISBN 978-0-582-40525-7.
- Madelung, Wilferd (1997). The Succession to Muhammad: A Study of the Early Caliphate. Cambridge: Cambridge University Press. ISBN 0-521-56181-7.
- Sourdel, D. (1965). "Dayr Murrān". In Lewis, B.; Pellat, Ch. & Schacht, J. (eds.). The Encyclopaedia of Islam, Second Edition. Volume II: C–G. Leiden: E. J. Brill. p. 198. OCLC 495469475.
