= Al-Walid I =

Umayyad caliph from 705 to 715

al-Walid I الوليد الأول
- Amir al-Mu'minin; Khalifat Allah
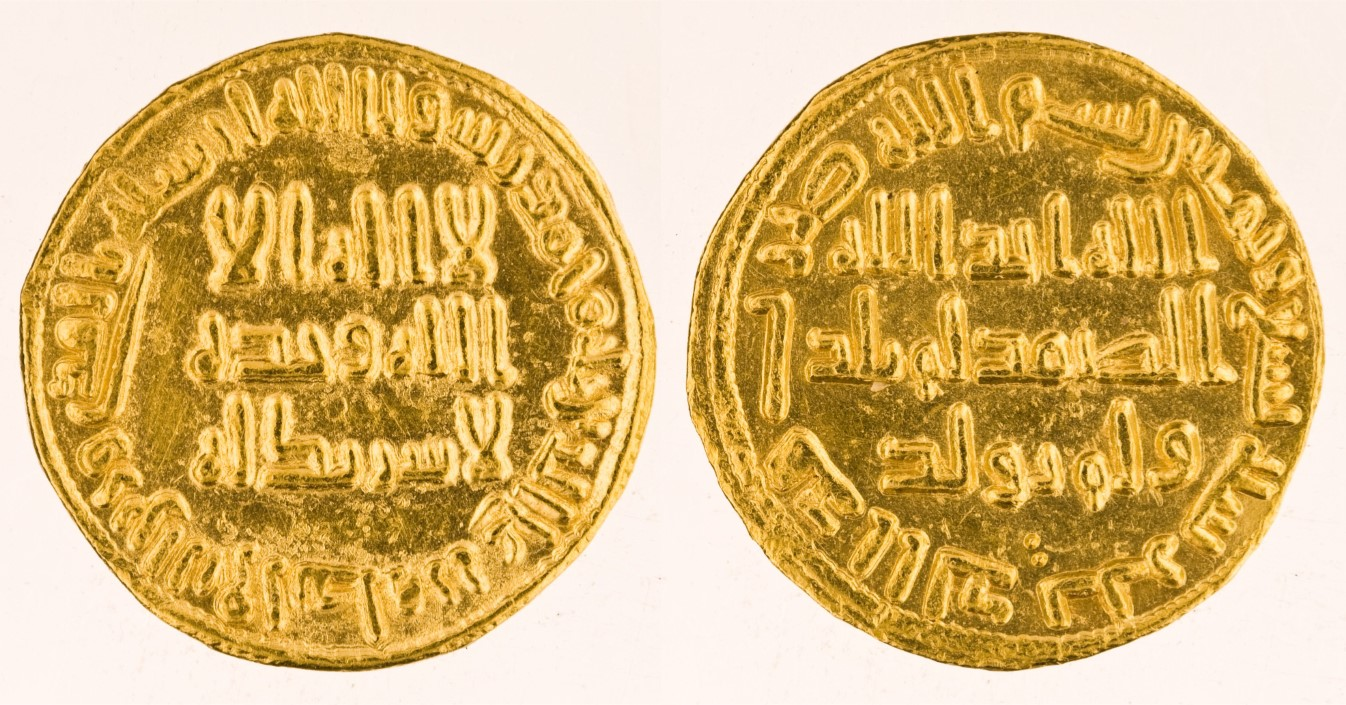
- Gold dinar of al-Walid, minted in Damascus, 707/08 CE

6th Caliph of the Umayyad Caliphate
- Reign: 9 October 705 – 23 February 715
- Predecessor: Abd al-Malik
- Successor: Sulayman
- Born: c. 674; Medina, Hejaz, Umayyad Caliphate
- Died: 23 February 715 (aged c. 41); Dayr Murran, Syria, Umayyad Caliphate
- Burial: Bab al-Saghir or Bab al-Faradis, Damascus
- Spouses: Umm al-Banin bint Abd al-Aziz; Umm ʿAbdallāh bint ʿAbdallāh ibn ʿAmr ibn ʿUthmān; ʿIzza bint ʿAbd al-ʿAzīz ibn ʿAmr ibn ʿUthman; Nafīsa bint Zayd ibn al-Ḥaṣan; Zaynab bint al-Ḥaṣan ibn al-Ḥaṣan; Āmīna bint Sāʾīd ibn al-ʿĀs; Shah-i-Afrid bint Peroz III (concubine); Budayra (concubine)
- Issue: al-ʿAbbās; ʿAbd al-ʿAzīz; ʿUmar al-Faḥl; Bishr; Masrūr; Yazid; Ibrahim; ʿAnbāsa; Marwān; Muḥammad; ʿĀʾisha (daughter); Rawḥ; Khālid; Maslama; Mansūr; Tammām; Mubashshir; Jazʾ; ʿAbd al-Raḥmān; Yaḥyā; Abū ʿUbayda; Ṣadaqā; ʿAbd al-Malik; al-Asʿad; ʿUthmān; al-Mubārak
- House: Marwanid
- Dynasty: Umayyad
- Father: ʿAbd al-Malīk ibn Marwān
- Mother: Wallāda bint al-ʿAbbās
- Religion: Islam

Al-Walid ibn Abd al-Malik ibn Marwan (Note: Arabic: الوليد بن عبد الملك بن مروان, romanized: al-Walīd ibn ʿAbd al-Malik ibn Marwān) (c. 674 – 23 February 715), (Note: The 9th-century historian Ya'qubi mentions two alternative death dates, 14 Jumada I 96 AH (25 January 715 CE) or the last day of Jumada II 96 AH (11 March 715).) commonly known as al-Walid I, (Note: Arabic: الوليد الأول) was the sixth Umayyad caliph, ruling from October 705 until his death in 715. He was the eldest son of his predecessor, Caliph Abd al-Malik (r. 685–705). As a prince, he led annual raids against the Byzantines from 695 to 698 and built or restored fortifications along the Syrian Desert route to Mecca. He became heir apparent in c. 705, after the death of the designated successor, Abd al-Malik's brother Abd al-Aziz ibn Marwan.

Under al-Walid, his father's efforts to centralize government, impose a more Arabic and Islamic character on the state, and expand its borders were continued. He heavily depended on al-Hajjaj ibn Yusuf, his father's powerful viceroy over the eastern half of the caliphate. During his reign, armies commissioned by al-Hajjaj conquered Sind and Transoxiana in the east, while the troops of Musa ibn Nusayr, the governor of Ifriqiya, conquered the Maghreb and Hispania in the west, bringing the caliphate to its largest territorial extent. War spoils from the conquests enabled al-Walid to finance impressive public works, including his greatest architectural achievement, the Great Mosque of Damascus, as well as the al-Aqsa Mosque in Jerusalem, the Prophet's Mosque in Medina, and the building of the historical city of Anjar. He was the first caliph to institute programs for social welfare, aiding the poor and handicapped among the Muslim Arabs of Syria, who held him in high esteem.

His reign was marked by domestic peace and prosperity and likely represented the peak of Umayyad power, though it is difficult to ascertain his direct role in its affairs. The balance al-Walid maintained among the elites, including the Qays and Yaman army factions, may have been his key personal achievement. On the other hand, the massive military expenditures of his rule, as well as his extravagant grants to the Umayyad princes, became a financial burden on his successors.

== Early life ==
Al-Walid was born in Medina in c. 674, during the rule of Mu'awiya I (r. 661–680), the founder and first caliph of the Umayyad Caliphate. His father, Abd al-Malik ibn Marwan, was a member of the Umayyad dynasty. While Mu'awiya belonged to the Umayyads' Sufyanid branch, resident in Syria, al-Walid's family was part of the larger Abu al-As line in the Hejaz (western Arabia, where Mecca and Medina are located). His mother, Wallada bint al-Abbas ibn al-Jaz, was a descendant of Zuhayr ibn Jadhima, a famous 6th-century chief of the Banu Abs tribe. In 684, after Umayyad rule collapsed amid the Second Fitna, the Umayyads of the Hejaz were expelled by a rival claimant to the caliphate, Abd Allah ibn al-Zubayr, and relocated to Syria. There al-Walid's grandfather, the elder statesman Marwan I (r. 684–685), was recognized as caliph by pro-Umayyad Arab tribes. With the tribes' support, he restored the dynasty's rule in Syria and Egypt by the end of his reign. Abd al-Malik succeeded Marwan and conquered the rest of the caliphate, namely Iraq, Iran, and Arabia. With the key assistance of his viceroy of Iraq, al-Hajjaj ibn Yusuf, Abd al-Malik instituted several centralization measures, which consolidated Umayyad territorial gains.

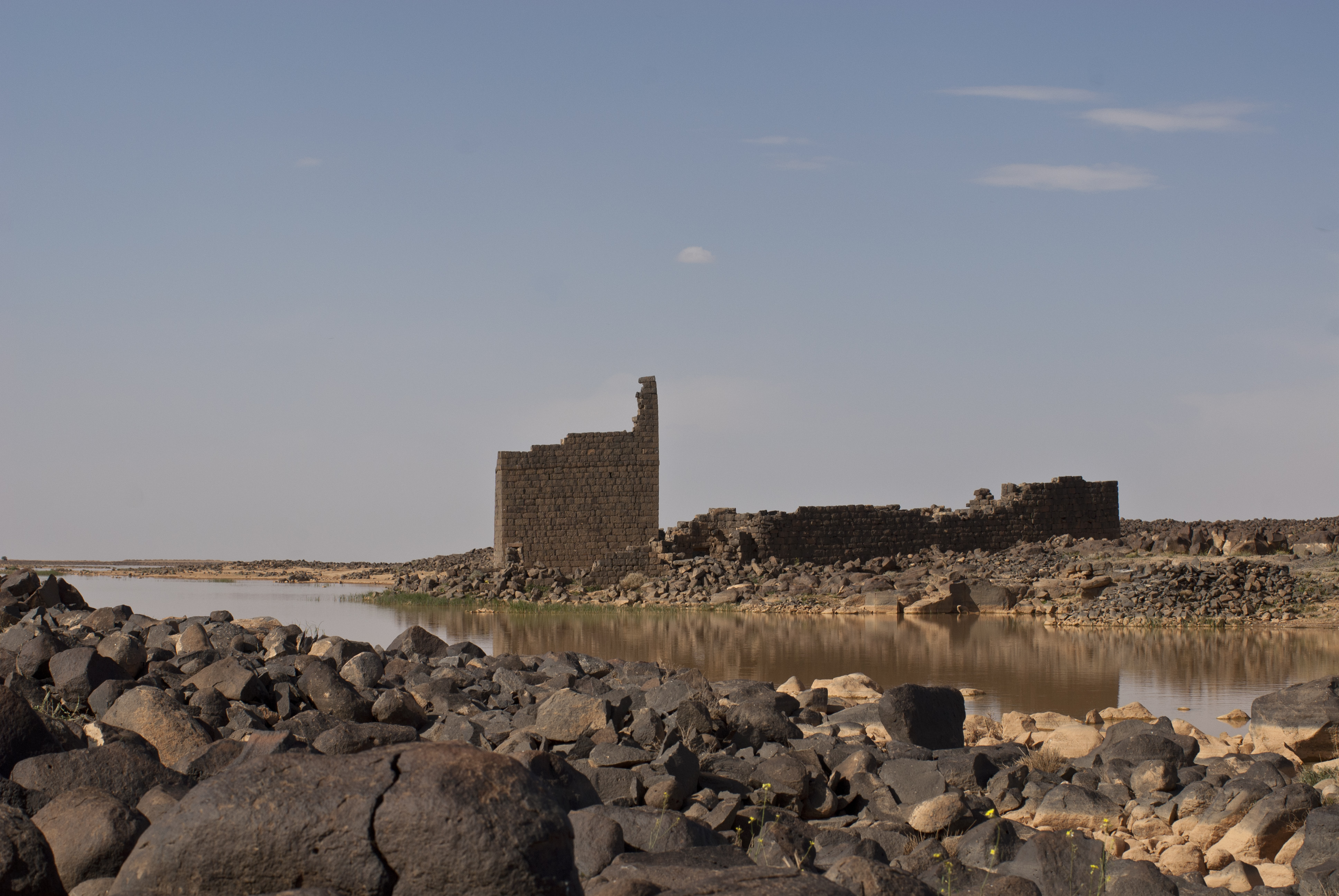
The ruins of Qasr Burqu', a fortified outpost in the Syrian Desert built or expanded by al-Walid while he was still a prince in 700/01 CE

The war with the Byzantine Empire, which dated to the Muslim conquest of Syria in the 630s, resumed in 692 after the collapse of the truce that had been reached three years earlier. Annual campaigns were thereafter launched by the Umayyads in the Arab–Byzantine frontier zone and beyond. During his father's caliphate, al-Walid led the campaigns in 696, 697, 698 and 699. In his summer 696 campaign, he raided the area between Malatya (Melitene) and al-Massisa (Mopsuestia), while in the following year, he targeted a place known in Arabic sources as 'Atmar', located at some point north of Malatya. He also led the annual Hajj pilgrimage in Mecca in 698.

In 700 or 701, al-Walid patronized the construction or expansion of Qasr Burqu', a fortified Syrian Desert outpost on the route connecting Palmyra in the north with the Azraq oasis and Wadi Sirhan basin in the south, ultimately leading to Mecca and Medina. His patronage is attested by an inscription naming him as "the emir al-Walid, son of the commander of the faithful". Al-Walid also built the nearby site of Jabal Says, likely as a Bedouin summer encampment between his base of operations in al-Qaryatayn and Qasr Burqu'. the historian Jere L. Bacharach speculates al-Walid used the sites, located in the territory of Arab tribes, to reaffirm their loyalty, which had been critical to the Umayyads during the civil war.

== Caliphate ==
Toward the end of his reign, Abd al-Malik, supported by al-Hajjaj, attempted to nominate al-Walid as his successor, abrogating the arrangement set by Marwan whereby Abd al-Malik's brother, the governor of Egypt, Abd al-Aziz, was slated to succeed. Though the latter refused to step down from the line of succession, he died in 704 or early 705, removing the principal obstacle to al-Walid's nomination. After the death of Abd al-Malik on 9 October 705, al-Walid acceded. Al-Walid was physically described by the 9th-century historian al-Ya'qubi as "tall and swarthy ... snub-nosed ... with a touch of gray [sic] at the tip of his beard". He noted that al-Walid "spoke ungrammatically". To his father's chagrin, al-Walid abandoned speaking the classical Arabic in which the Qur'an was written but insisted that everyone in his company have knowledge of the Qur'an.

Al-Walid essentially continued his father's policies of centralization and expansion. Unlike Abd al-Malik, al-Walid heavily depended on al-Hajjaj and allowed him free rein over the eastern half of the caliphate. Moreover, al-Hajjaj strongly influenced al-Walid's internal decision-making, with officials often being installed and dismissed upon the viceroy's recommendation.

=== Territorial expansion ===
A map depicting the expansion of the caliphate. The Maghreb, Hispania, Sind and Transoxiana, including Khwarazm, Tukharistan and Ferghana, (the areas shaded in green) were all conquered during al-Walid's reign

The renewal of the Muslim conquests on the eastern and western frontiers had begun under Abd al-Malik, after he neutralized the Umayyads' domestic opponents. Under al-Walid, the armies of the caliphate "received a fresh impulse" and a "period of great conquests" began, in the words of the historian Julius Wellhausen. During the second half of al-Walid's reign, the Umayyads reached their furthest territorial extent.

==== Eastern frontiers ====
Expansion from the eastern frontiers was overseen by al-Hajjaj from Iraq. His lieutenant governor of Khurasan, Qutayba ibn Muslim, launched several campaigns in Transoxiana (Central Asia), which had been a largely impenetrable region for earlier Muslim armies, between 705 and 715. Qutayba gained the surrender of Bukhara in 706–709, Khwarazm and Samarkand in 711–712, and Farghana in 713. He mainly secured Umayyad suzerainty through tributary alliances with local rulers, whose power remained intact. With Qutayba's death in 716, his army disbanded and the weak Arab position in Transoxiana allowed for the local princes and the Turgesh nomads to roll back most of Qutayba's gains by the early 720s. From 708 or 709, al-Hajjaj's nephew, Muhammad ibn al-Qasim, conquered Sind, the northwestern part of South Asia.

==== Western frontiers ====
In the west, al-Walid's governor in Ifriqiya (central North Africa), Musa ibn Nusayr, another holdover from Abd al-Malik's reign, subjugated the Berbers of the Hawwara, Zenata and Kutama confederations and advanced on the Maghreb (western North Africa). In 708 or 709, he conquered Tangier and Sus, in the far north and south of modern-day Morocco. Musa's Berber mawla (freedman or client; pl. mawali), Tariq ibn Ziyad, invaded the Visigothic Kingdom of Hispania (the Iberian Peninsula) in 711, and was reinforced by Musa in the following year. By 716, a year after al-Walid's death, Hispania had been largely conquered. The massive war spoils netted by the conquests of Transoxiana, Sind and Hispania were comparable to the amounts accrued in the Muslim conquests during the reign of Caliph Umar (r. 634–644).

==== Byzantine front ====
Al-Walid appointed his half-brother Maslama as governor of the Jazira (Upper Mesopotamia) and charged him with leading the war effort against Byzantium. Although Maslama established a strong power base in the frontier zone, the Umayyads made few territorial gains during al-Walid's reign. After a lengthy siege, the Byzantine fortress of Tyana was captured and sacked in c. 708. (Note: The primary sources give different dates for the city's fall, ranging from 707 to 710. The event is generally placed in 708 or 709 by modern scholars.) Al-Walid did not lead any of the annual or bi-annual campaigns, but his eldest son al-Abbas fought reputably alongside Maslama. His other sons Abd al-Aziz, Umar, Bishr and Marwan also led raids.

By 712, the Arabs solidified their control of Cilicia and the areas east of the Euphrates River and launched raids deep into Anatolia. After one such raid against Ancyra in 714, the Byzantine emperor Anastasios II (r. 713–715) sent a delegation to negotiate a truce with al-Walid or decipher his intentions. The delegates reported back that al-Walid was planning a land and naval assault to conquer the Byzantine capital Constantinople. Al-Walid died in 715 and the siege was carried out under his successors, ending in 718 as a disaster for the Arabs.

=== Provincial affairs ===
==== Syria ====
Al-Walid entrusted most of Syria's military districts to his sons; al-Abbas was assigned to Homs, Abd al-Aziz to Damascus, and Umar to Jordan. In Palestine, al-Walid's brother Sulayman had been appointed by their father as governor and remained in office under al-Walid. Sulayman sheltered the deposed governor of Khurasan, Yazid ibn al-Muhallab, a fugitive from al-Hajjaj's prison, in 708. Despite his initial disapproval, al-Walid pardoned Yazid as a result of Sulayman's lobbying and payment of the heavy fine that al-Hajjaj had imposed on Yazid.

==== Egypt ====
Between 693 and 700, Abd al-Malik and al-Hajjaj initiated the dual processes of establishing a single Islamic currency in place of the previously used Byzantine and Sasanian coinage and replacing Greek and Persian with Arabic as the language of the bureaucracy in Syria and Iraq, respectively. These administrative reforms continued under al-Walid, during whose reign, in 705 or 706, Arabic replaced Greek and Coptic in the diwan (government departments) of Egypt. The change was implemented by al-Walid's half-brother, Abd Allah, the governor of Egypt and appointee of Abd al-Malik. These policies effected the gradual transition of Arabic as the sole official language of the state, unified the varied tax systems of the caliphate's provinces and contributed to the establishment of a more ideologically Islamic government. In 709, al-Walid replaced Abd Allah with his katib (scribe), Qurra ibn Sharik al-Absi, who belonged to the same tribe as the caliph's mother. This was prompted either because of mounting complaints against Abd Allah's corruption, which was blamed for Egypt's first recorded famine under Islamic rule, or a desire to install a loyalist as governor. Qurra ibn Sharik served until his death in 715 and established a more efficient means of tax collection, reorganized Egypt's army and, on al-Walid's orders, restored the mosque of Fustat.

==== Hejaz ====
Al-Walid initially kept Abd al-Malik's appointee, Hisham ibn Isma'il al-Makhzumi, as governor of the Hejaz and leader of the Hajj pilgrimage. Both offices were of great prestige owing to the central religious importance of Mecca and Medina, the two holiest cities of Islam. Al-Walid dismissed him in 706 as punishment for flogging and humiliating the prominent Medinan scholar Sa'id ibn al-Musayyib for refusing to give the oath of allegiance to al-Walid as heir apparent during Abd al-Malik's reign. Although Hisham's act was in support of al-Walid, he considered it an abusive excess. According to the historian M. E. McMillan, other than al-Walid's "sense of righteous indignation", dynastic politics motivated his dismissal order. Hisham was the maternal grandfather of al-Walid's half-brother Hisham, who was a contender for the caliphal succession, which al-Walid coveted for his son Abd al-Aziz. Rather than leaving such a close relative of his brother Hisham at the helm of the Islamic holy cities, al-Walid installed his cousin Umar ibn Abd al-Aziz, who was the husband of al-Walid's sister Fatima and brother to al-Walid's wife Umm al-Banin, the mother of Abd al-Aziz. On al-Walid's orders, Umar had Hisham publicly humiliated, an unprecedented motion against a sacked governor of Medina, which set "a dangerous precedent", according to McMillan. (Note: Following the precedent of Hisham's public humiliation, several Umayyad governors of Medina underwent public humiliations and floggings by their successors upon dismissal from office, including Uthman ibn Hayyan al-Murri in 715, Abu Bakr ibn Muhammad ibn Amr ibn Hazm in 720–721, Abd al-Rahman ibn al-Dahhak ibn Qays al-Fihri in 723, and Hisham's sons Ibrahim and Muhammad in 743.)

Umar maintained friendly ties to the holy cities' religious circles. He led the Hajj for at least four of the six years he was in office, with al-Walid's son Umar leading it in 707 and al-Walid leading it in 710, the only time he left Syria during his caliphate. (Note: According to al-Mas'udi, al-Walid also led the Hajj pilgrimage in 707.) Umar provided safe haven to Iraqis evading the persecution of al-Hajjaj. Umar informed al-Walid of al-Hajjaj's abuses, while al-Hajjaj advised the caliph to dismiss Umar for hosting Iraqi rebels. Al-Walid, wary of the Hejaz once again developing into a center of anti-Umayyad activity as it had during the Second Fitna, dismissed Umar in 712. He split the governorship of the Hejaz, appointing al-Hajjaj's nominees Khalid ibn Abdallah al-Qasri to Mecca and Uthman ibn Hayyan al-Murri to Medina. Neither was ever appointed to lead the Hajj, al-Walid reserving that office for Maslama and his own sons.

=== Balancing of tribal factions ===
As a result of the Battle of Marj Rahit, which inaugurated Marwan's reign in 684, a sharp division developed among the Syrian Arab tribes, who formed the core of the Umayyad army. The loyalist tribes that supported Marwan formed the Yaman confederation, alluding to ancestral roots in Yemen (South Arabia), while the Qays, or northern Arab tribes, largely supported Ibn al-Zubayr. Abd al-Malik reconciled with the Qays in 691, but competition for influence between the two factions intensified as the Syrian army was increasingly empowered and deployed to the provinces, where they replaced or supplemented Iraqi and other garrisons.

Al-Walid maintained his father's policy of balancing the power of the two factions in the military and administration. According to the historian Hugh N. Kennedy, it is "possible that the caliph kept it [the rivalry] on the boil so that one faction [would] not acquire a monopoly of power". Al-Walid's mother genealogically belonged to the Qays and he accorded Qaysi officials certain advantages. However, Wellhausen doubts that al-Walid preferred one faction over the other, "for he had no need to do so, and it is not reported" by the medieval historians. The Qays–Yaman division intensified under al-Walid's successors, who did not maintain his balancing act. The feud was a major contributor to the Umayyad regime's demise in 750.

=== Public works and social welfare ===
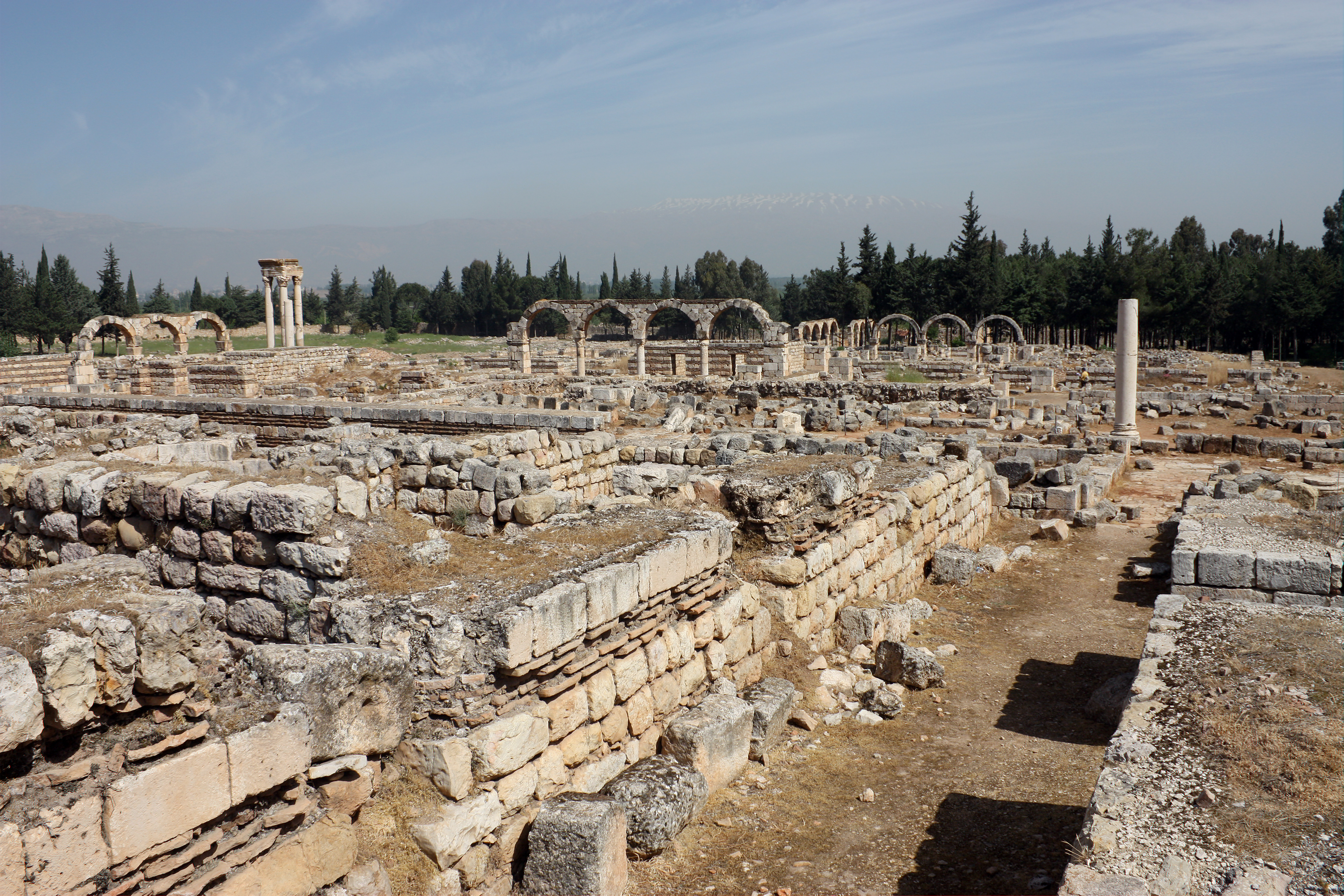
Ruins of the Umayyad city of Anjar, founded by al-Walid I in modern-day Lebanon

From the beginning of his rule, al-Walid inaugurated public works and social welfare programs on a scale unprecedented in the caliphate's history. The efforts were financed by treasure accrued from the conquests and tax revenue. He and his brothers and sons built way-stations and dug wells along the roads in Syria and installed street lighting in the cities. They invested in land reclamation projects, entailing irrigation networks and canals, which boosted agricultural production. Al-Hajjaj also carried out irrigation and canal projects in Iraq during this period, in a bid to restore its agricultural infrastructure, damaged by years of warfare, and to find employment for its demobilized inhabitants.

Al-Walid or his son al-Abbas founded the city of Anjar, between Damascus and Beirut, in 714. It included a mosque, palace, and residential, commercial, and administrative structures. According to the art historian Robert Hillenbrand, Anjar "has the best claim of any Islamic foundation datable before 750 ... to be a city", though it was probably abandoned within forty years of its construction. In the Hejaz, al-Walid attempted to redress the hardships of pilgrims making the trek to Mecca by having water wells dug throughout the province, improving access through the mountain passes, and building a drinking fountain in Mecca. The historian M. A. Shaban theorizes that while al-Walid's projects in the cities of Syria and the Hejaz had a "utilitarian purpose", they were mainly intended to provide employment, in the form of cheap labor, for the growing non-Arab populations in the cities.

Welfare programs included financial relief for the poor and servants to assist the handicapped, though this initiative was limited to Syria, and only to the Arab Muslims there. As such, Shaban considered it "a special state subsidy to the ruling class". He is sometimes credited with establishing the first bimaristan (hospital) in the Islamic world in Damascus in 707, but this has been disputed among historians. The claim is largely based on the writings of later medieval historians such as al-Tabari (d. 923) and al-Maqrizi (d. 1442). Modern historians Michael W. Dols and Douglas Morton Dunlop concluded that some of the early historical sources suggest that al-Walid I created something like a leprosarium (a segregated hospice for lepers) rather than a hospital, consistent with contemporary Byzantine practices. Historian Lawrence Conrad concluded that al-Walid did not establish a hospital, and this view was accepted by multiple other historians, including Peregine Horden and Peter E. Pormann. More recently, Ahmed Ragab argued that there is no evidence that al-Walid's foundation resembled the later bimaristans of the Islamic world, which were more sophisticated medical institutions, but that there is evidence he would have established charitable institutions offering shelter for lepers, the blind, and the handicapped. These likely continued or competed with existing Byzantine charitable institutions of the era and may have formed a precedent that was continued by later Muslim institutions.

==== Patronage of great mosques ====
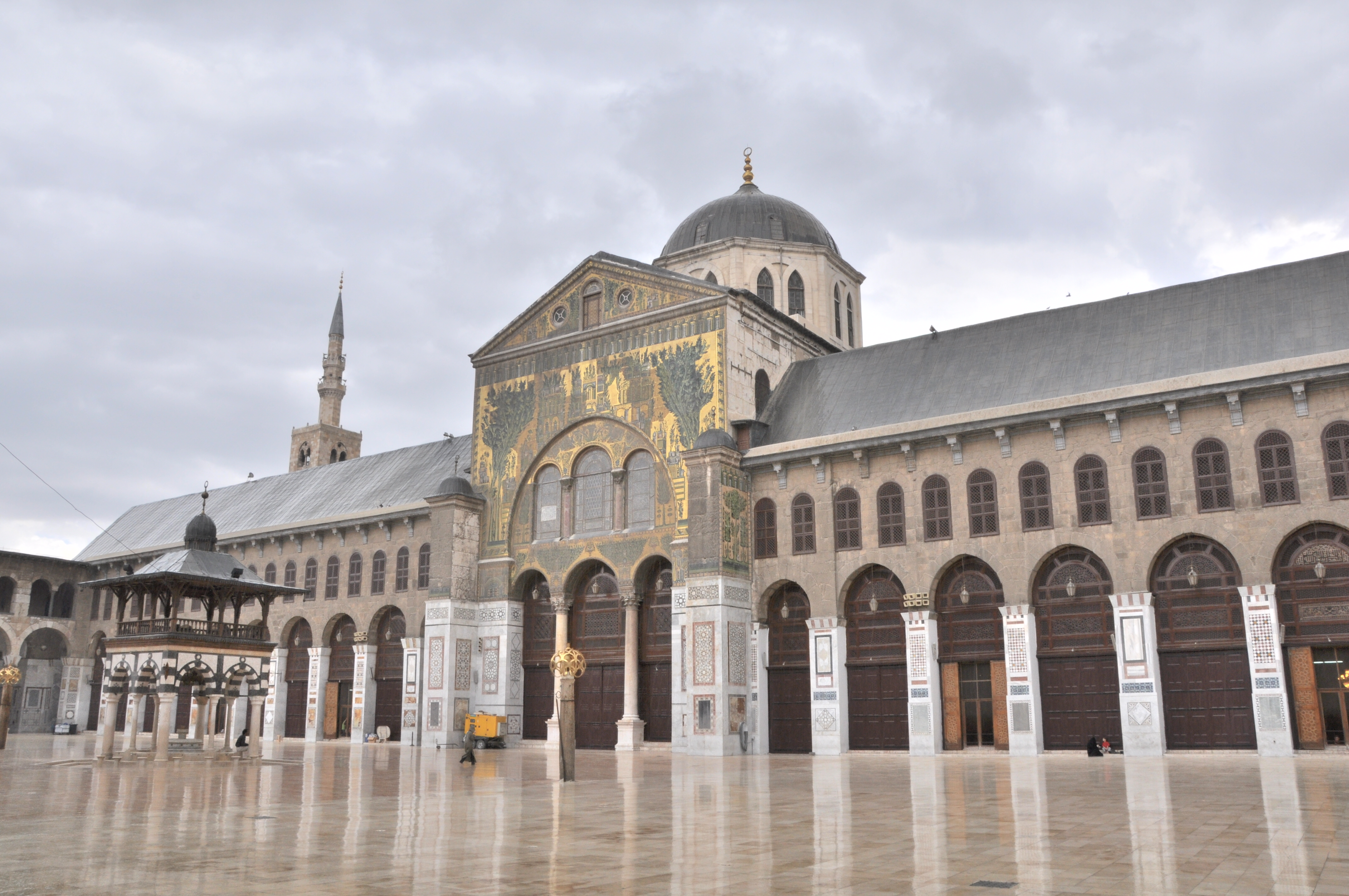
The Umayyad Mosque of Damascus, which has maintained much of its original form since its founding by al-Walid

Al-Walid turned the example of his father's construction of the Dome of the Rock in Jerusalem into a wide-scale building program. His patronage of great mosques in Damascus, Jerusalem and Medina underlined his political legitimacy and religious credentials. The mosque he founded in Damascus, later known as the Umayyad Mosque, was the greatest architectural achievement of his rule. Under his predecessors, Muslim residents had worshipped in a small musalla (prayer room) attached to the 4th-century Christian cathedral of John the Baptist. By al-Walid's reign, the musalla could not cope with the fast-growing Muslim community and no sufficient free spaces were available in Damascus for a large congregational mosque. In 705, al-Walid had the cathedral converted into a mosque, compensating local Christians with other properties in the city.

Most of the structure was demolished. Al-Walid's architects replaced the demolished space with a large prayer hall and a courtyard bordered on all sides by a closed portico with double arcades. The mosque was completed in 711. The army of Damascus, numbering some 45,000 soldiers, were taxed a quarter of their salaries for nine years to pay for its construction. The scale and grandeur of the great mosque made it a "symbol of the political supremacy and moral prestige of Islam", according to the historian Nikita Elisséeff. Noting al-Walid's awareness of architecture's propaganda value, Hillenbrand calls the mosque a "victory monument" intended as a "visible statement of Muslim supremacy and permanence". The mosque has maintained its original form until the present day.

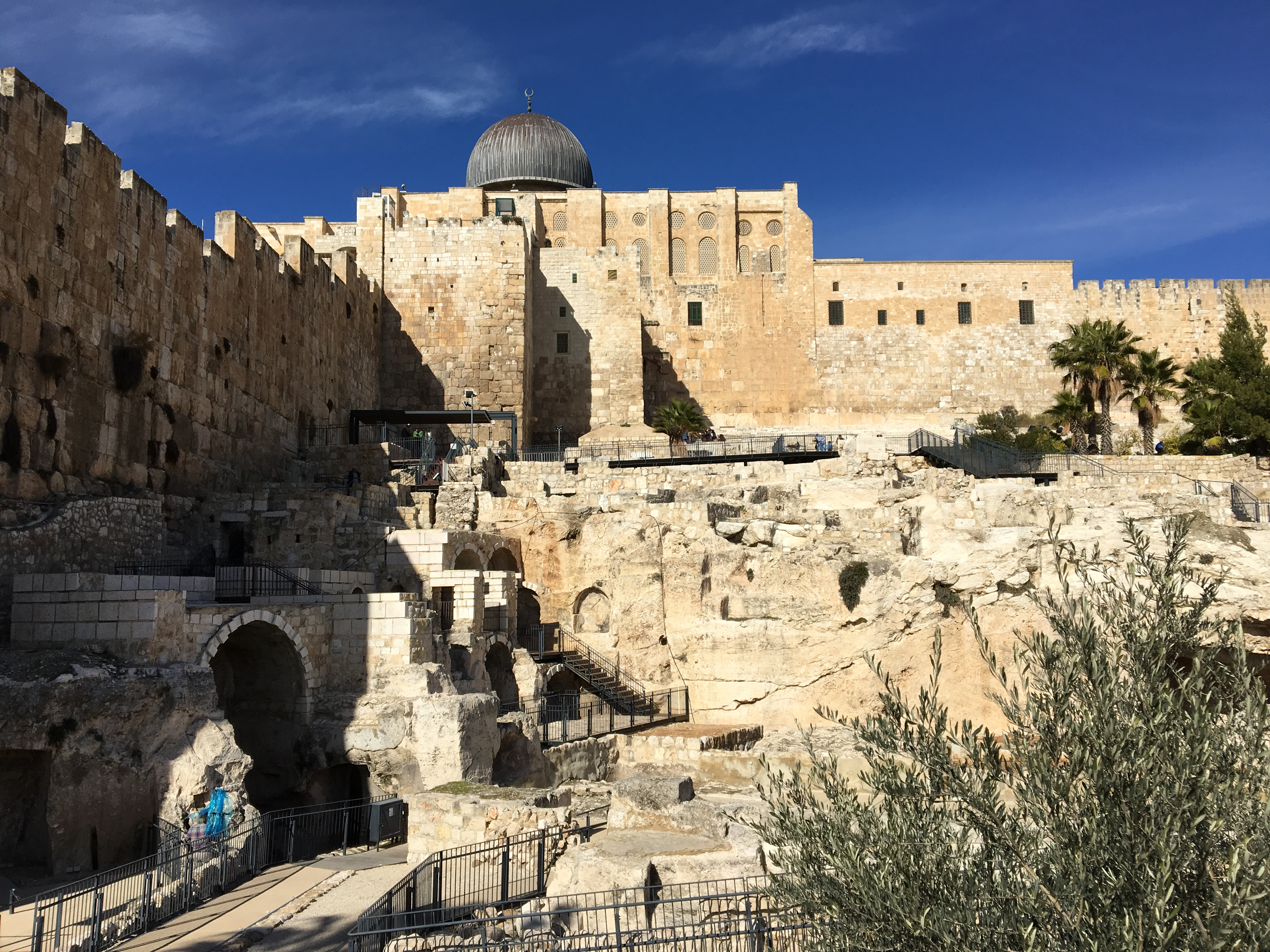
Excavated ruins of the Umayyad palatial and administrative structures south of the al-Aqsa Mosque Compound. These unfinished buildings and the Qibli (al-Aqsa) Mosque are generally attributed to al-Walid, though the mosque has been substantially altered since al-Walid's reign.

In Jerusalem, al-Walid continued his father's works on the Temple Mount. There is disagreement as to whether the al-Aqsa Mosque, which was built on the same axis of the Dome of the Rock on the Temple Mount, was originally built by Abd al-Malik or al-Walid. Several architectural historians hold that Abd al-Malik commissioned the project and that al-Walid finished or expanded it. (Note: K. A. C. Creswell, the archaeologists Robert Hamilton and Henri Stern, and the historian F. E. Peters attribute the original Umayyad construction to al-Walid. Other architectural historians, Julian Rabi, Jere Bacharach, and Yildirim Yavuz, as well as the scholars H. I. Bell, Rafi Grafman and Myriam Rosen-Ayalon, and Amikam Elad, assert or suggest that Abd al-Malik started the project and al-Walid finished or expanded it.) The earliest source indicating al-Walid's work on the mosque is the Aphrodito Papyri, which contain letters from December 708 – June 711 between his governor of Egypt, Qurra ibn Sharik, and an official in Upper Egypt discussing the dispatch of Egyptian laborers and craftsmen to help build the "Mosque of Jerusalem". It is likely that the unfinished administrative and residential structures that were built opposite the southern and eastern walls of the Temple Mount, next to the mosque, date to the era of al-Walid, who died before they could be completed.

In 706 or 707, al-Walid instructed Umar ibn Abd al-Aziz to significantly enlarge the Prophet's Mosque in Medina. Its redevelopment entailed the demolition of the living quarters of Muhammad's wives and the incorporation of the graves of Muhammad and the first two caliphs, Abu Bakr (r. 632–634) and Umar. The vocal opposition to the demolition of Muhammad's home from local religious circles was dismissed by al-Walid. He lavished large sums for the reconstruction and supplied mosaics and Greek and Coptic (Egyptian) craftsmen. According to Hillenbrand, the building of a large-scale mosque in Medina, the original center of the caliphate, was an "acknowledgement" by al-Walid of "his own roots and those of Islam itself" and possibly an attempt to appease Medinan resentment at the loss of the city's political importance to Syria under the Umayyads. In the words of McMillan, the mosque and the works benefitting the pilgrims to the holy cities "were a form of reconciliation ... a constructive counterweight to the political damage" caused by the Umayyad sieges of Mecca in 683 and 692 and assault on Medina during the civil war. Other mosques that al-Walid is credited for expanding in the Hejaz include the Masjid Al-Haram around the Kaaba in Mecca which saw its fourth expansion, and the mosque of Ta'if. in addition to the reconstructions of the mosque of Amr ibn al-As in Fustat (Cairo) and the Great Mosque of Sanaa.

== Death and succession ==
Al-Walid died of an illness in Dayr Murran, an Umayyad winter estate on the outskirts of Damascus, on 23 February 715, about one year after al-Hajjaj's death. He was buried in Damascus at the cemetery of Bab al-Saghir or Bab al-Faradis and Umar ibn Abd al-Aziz led the funeral prayers.

Al-Walid unsuccessfully attempted to nominate his son Abd al-Aziz as his successor and void the arrangements set by his father, in which Sulayman was to succeed al-Walid. Relations between the two brothers had become strained. Sulayman acceded and dismissed nearly all of al-Walid's governors. Although he maintained the militarist policies of al-Walid and Abd al-Malik, expansion of the caliphate largely ground to a halt under Sulayman (r. 715–717).

== Assessment and legacy ==
According to the historian Giorgio Levi Della Vida, "The caliphate of al-Walīd saw the harvest of the seed planted by the long work of ʿAbd al-Malik". In the assessment of Shaban:

Walīd I's reign (705–15/86–96) was in every way a direct continuation of his father's and was unruffled. Ḥajjāj remained in power, in fact he became more powerful, and the same policies were followed. The only difference was that the tranquillity of these years allowed Walīd to develop further the internal implications of the ʿAbdulmalik-Ḥajjāj policy.

The historian Gerald Hawting comments that the combined reigns of al-Walid and Abd al-Malik, tied together by al-Hajjaj, represented in "some ways the high point of Umayyad power, witnessing significant territorial advances both in the east and the west and the emergence of a more marked Arabic and Islamic character in the state's public face". Domestically, it was generally a period of peace and prosperity. Kennedy asserts that al-Walid's reign was "remarkably successful and represents, perhaps, the zenith of Umayyad power", though his direct role in these successes is unclear and his primary accomplishment may have been maintaining the equilibrium between the rival factions of the Umayyad family and military.

By virtue of the conquests of Hispania, Sind and Transoxiana during his reign, his patronage of the great mosques of Damascus and Medina, and his charitable works, al-Walid's Syrian contemporaries viewed him as "the worthiest of their caliphs", according to the 9th-century historian Umar ibn Shabba. Several panegyrics were dedicated to al-Walid and his sons by al-Farazdaq, his official court poet. The latter's contemporary, Jarir, lamented the caliph's death in verse: "O eye, weep copious tears aroused by remembrance; after today there is no point in your tears being stored." The Christian poet al-Akhtal considered al-Walid to be "the caliph of God through whose sunna rain is sought".

Al-Walid embraced the formal trappings of monarchy in a manner unprecedented among earlier caliphs. He resided at several palaces, including in Khunasira in northern Syria and Dayr Murran. The considerable wealth in his treasury allowed him to spend extravagantly on his relatives. Expectations of such grants among the growing number of Umayyad princes continued under his successors. Their generous stipends and costly private constructions were resented by "nearly everyone else" in the caliphate and were "a drain on the treasury", according to the historian Khalid Yahya Blankinship. More significant were the costs to equip and pay the armies driving the conquests. The substantial expenditures under both Abd al-Malik and al-Walid became a financial burden on their successors, under whom the flow of war spoils, on which the caliphal economy depended, began to diminish. Blankinship notes that the enormous losses incurred during the 717–718 siege of Constantinople alone "practically wiped out the gains made under al-Walid".

== Family ==
Compared to his brothers, al-Walid had an "exceptional number of marriages", at least nine, which "reflect both his seniority in age ... and his prestige as a likely successor" to Abd al-Malik, according to the historian Andrew Marsham. The marriages were intended to forge political alliances, including with potential rival families like those of the descendants of the fourth caliph, Ali (r. 656–661), and the prominent Umayyad statesman, Sa'id ibn al-As. Al-Walid married two of Ali's great-granddaughters, Nafisa bint Zayd ibn al-Hasan and Zaynab bint al-Hasan ibn al-Hasan. He married Sa'id's daughter, Amina, whose brother Amr al-Ashdaq had been removed from the line of succession by Marwan and was killed in an attempt to topple Abd al-Malik. One of his wives was a daughter of a Qurayshite leader, Abd Allah ibn Muti, who was a key official under Ibn al-Zubayr. Among his other wives was a woman of the Qaysi Banu Fazara tribe, with whom he had his son Abu Ubayda.

Marsham notes al-Walid's marriage to his first cousin, Umm al-Banin, "tied the fortunes" of Abd al-Malik and her father, Abd al-Aziz ibn Marwan. From her al-Walid had his sons Abd al-Aziz, Muhammad, Marwan, and Anbasa, and a daughter, A'isha. From another Umayyad wife, Umm Abd Allah bint Abd Allah ibn Amr, a great-granddaughter of Caliph Uthman (r. 644–656), al-Walid had his son Abd al-Rahman. He also married Umm Abd Allah's niece, Izza bint Abd al-Aziz, whom he divorced. (Note: After al-Walid's death, Umm Abd Allah married his nephew Ayyub, the son and would-be successor of Caliph Sulayman. Izza married al-Walid's brother Bakkar ibn Abd al-Malik. Their consistent marriages with the Marwanids indicates the high favor their family enjoyed with the Umayyad caliphs.)

Out of his twenty-two children, fifteen were born to slave concubines, including al-Abbas, whose mother was Greek. According to al-Tabari, the mother of al-Walid's son Yazid III (r. 744–744) was Shah-i-Afrid (also called Shahfarand), the daughter of the Sasanian prince Peroz III and granddaughter of the last Sasanian king, Yazdegerd III (r. 632–651). She had been taken captive in the conquest of Transoxiana and was gifted to al-Walid by al-Hajjaj. The mother of his son Ibrahim (r. 744–744) was a concubine named Su'ar or Budayra. His other sons by concubines were Umar, Bishr, Masrur, Mansur, Rawh, Khalid, Jaz, Maslama, Tammam, Mubashshir, Yahya, and Sadaqa.

In 744, around a dozen of al-Walid's sons, probably resentful at being sidelined from the caliphal succession, conspired with other Umayyad princes and elites under Yazid III to topple their cousin Caliph al-Walid II (r. 743–744). His assassination in April 744 sparked the Third Fitna (744–750). Yazid III acceded but died six months later, after which he was succeeded by his half-brother Ibrahim. The latter did not attain wide recognition and was overthrown in December 744 by a distant Umayyad kinsman, Marwan II (r. 744–750). Several descendants of al-Walid, progeny of his son Rawh, were executed during the Abbasid Revolution which toppled Umayyad rule in 750. Others from the lines of his sons al-Abbas and Umar survived, including the Habibi family, which attained prominence in the Umayyad emirate of al-Andalus after its establishment in 756. (Note: The Habibi family were descended from al-Walid's great-grandson, Habib ibn Abd al-Malik ibn Umar, and its members were governors, qadis, poets and major landowners in the Umayyad emirate in al-Andalus up to the late 9th century. The 10th-century historian Ibn Hazm of al-Andalus lists four additional sons of al-Walid: Abd al-Malik, al-As'ad, Uthman and al-Mubarak, some of whose descendants settled in the emirate.)

Descendants of al-Walid I

al-Walid I (r. 705–715)
al-Abbas	17 others	Abd al-Aziz	Umar al-Fahl	Bishr	Masrur	Yazid III (r. 744–744)	Ibrahim (r. 744–744)	Rawh	Tammam	al-As'ad
al-Harith	Nasr	Atiq	Abd al-Malik	Isa	Hafs	Ishaq	al-Walid	al-Walid	Umar
Habib	al-Abbas	Isma'il
Banu Habib	Ibrahim	Ya'qub
Abu Safwan	Musa
Uthman	Ubaydallah	Asad	Sa'id
Ahmad	Amr

Marwanid caliph

== Bibliography ==
- Ahmed, Asad Q. (2011). The Religious Elite of the Early Islamic Ḥijāz: Five Prosopographical Case Studies. Oxford: Unit for Prosopographical Research, Linacre College, University of Oxford. ISBN 978-1-900934-13-8.
- Allan, J. W. (1991). "New Additions to the New Edition". Muqarnas. 8: 12–22. doi:10.2307/1523148. JSTOR 1523148.
- Bacharach, Jere L. (1996). "Marwanid Umayyad Building Activities: Speculations on Patronage". In Necpoğlu, Gülru (ed.). Muqarnas: An Annual on the Visual Culture of the Islamic World, Volume 13. Leiden: Brill. pp. 27–44. ISBN 90-04-10633-2.
- Bell, H. I. (1908). "The Aphrodito Papyri". The Journal of Hellenic Studies. 28: 97–120. doi:10.2307/624559. JSTOR 624559. S2CID 164184450.
- Blachère, R. (1965). "al-Farazdak". In Lewis, B.; Pellat, Ch. & Schacht, J. (eds.). The Encyclopaedia of Islam, Second Edition. Volume II: C–G. Leiden: E. J. Brill. pp. 788–789. OCLC 495469475.
- Blankinship, Khalid Yahya (1994). The End of the Jihâd State: The Reign of Hishām ibn ʻAbd al-Malik and the Collapse of the Umayyads. Albany, New York: State University of New York Press. ISBN 978-0-7914-1827-7.
- Crone, Patricia (1980). Slaves on Horses: The Evolution of the Islamic Polity (1980 ed.). Cambridge: Cambridge University Press. ISBN 978-0521229616.
- Crone, Patricia; Hinds, Martin (1986). God's Caliph: Religious Authority in the First Centuries of Islam. Cambridge: Cambridge University Press. ISBN 0-521-32185-9.
- Della Vida, G. Levi (1993) [1913–1938]. "Umaiyads". In Houtsma, M. Th.; Wensinck, A. J.; Gibb, H. A. R.; Heffening, W.; Lévi-Provençal, E. (eds.). E. J. Brill's First Encyclopedia of Islam, 1913–1936, Volume VIII Ṭāʾif–Zūrkhāna. Leiden, New York, and Köln: Brill. pp. 998–1004. ISBN 978-90-04-09794-0.
- Dietrich, A. (1971). "al-Ḥadjdjādj b. Yūsuf". In Lewis, B.; Ménage, V. L.; Pellat, Ch. & Schacht, J. (eds.). The Encyclopaedia of Islam, Second Edition. Volume III: H–Iram. Leiden: E. J. Brill. pp. 39–43. OCLC 495469525.
- Duri, A. A. (1965). "Dīwān". In Lewis, B.; Pellat, Ch. & Schacht, J. (eds.). The Encyclopaedia of Islam, Second Edition. Volume II: C–G. Leiden: E. J. Brill. pp. 323–327. OCLC 495469475.
- Eisener, R. (1997). "Sulaymān b. ʿAbd al-Malik". In Bosworth, C. E.; van Donzel, E.; Heinrichs, W. P. & Lecomte, G. (eds.). The Encyclopaedia of Islam, Second Edition. Volume IX: San–Sze. Leiden: E. J. Brill. pp. 821–822. ISBN 978-90-04-10422-8.
- Elad, Amikam (1999). Medieval Jerusalem and Islamic Worship: Holy Places, Ceremonies, Pilgrimage (2nd ed.). Leiden, Boston and Köln: Brill. ISBN 90-04-10010-5.
- Elisséeff, N. (1965). "Dimashk". In Lewis, B.; Pellat, Ch. & Schacht, J. (eds.). The Encyclopaedia of Islam, Second Edition. Volume II: C–G. Leiden: E. J. Brill. pp. 277–291. OCLC 495469475.
- Fowden, Garth (2004). Quṣayr 'Amra: Art and the Umayyad Elite in Late Antique Syria. Berkeley and Los Angeles: University of California Press. ISBN 0-520-23665-3.
- Gibb, H. A. R. (1923). The Arab Conquests in Central Asia. London: The Royal Asiatic Society.
- Gibb, H. A. R. (1960). "ʿAbd al-Malik b. Marwān". In Gibb, H. A. R.; Kramers, J. H.; Lévi-Provençal, E.; Schacht, J.; Lewis, B. & Pellat, Ch. (eds.). The Encyclopaedia of Islam, Second Edition. Volume I: A–B. Leiden: E. J. Brill. pp. 76–77. OCLC 495469456.
- Gil, Moshe (1997). "The Babylonian Encounter and the Exilarchic House in the Light of Cairo Geniza Documents and Parallel Arab Sources". In Golb, Norman (ed.). Judaeo-Arabic Studies: Proceedings of the Founding Conference of the Society for Judaeo-Arabic Studies. Amsterdam: Harwood Academic Publishers. pp. 135–174. ISBN 90-5702-082-3.
- Gordon, Matthew S.; Robinson, Chase F.; Rowson, Everett K.; Fishbein, Michael, eds. (2018). The Works of Ibn Wāḍiḥ al-Yaʿqūbī (Volume 3): An English Translation. Leiden and Boston: Brill. ISBN 978-90-04-35621-4.
- Grabar, O. (1986). "Al-Kuds—B. Monuments". In Bosworth, C. E.; van Donzel, E.; Lewis, B. & Pellat, Ch. (eds.). The Encyclopaedia of Islam, Second Edition. Volume V: Khe–Mahi. Leiden: E. J. Brill. pp. 339–344. ISBN 978-90-04-07819-2.
- Grafman, Rafi; Rosen-Ayalon, Myriam (1999). "The Two Great Syrian Umayyad Mosques: Jerusalem and Damascus". Muqarnas. 16: 1–15. doi:10.2307/1523262. JSTOR 1523262.
- Hawting, Gerald R. (2000). The First Dynasty of Islam: The Umayyad Caliphate AD 661–750 (Second ed.). London and New York: Routledge. ISBN 0-415-24072-7.
- Hawting, Gerald R. (2002). "Yazīd (III) b. al-Walīd". In Bearman, P. J.; Bianquis, Th.; Bosworth, C. E.; van Donzel, E. & Heinrichs, W. P. (eds.). The Encyclopaedia of Islam, Second Edition. Volume XI: W–Z. Leiden: E. J. Brill. pp. 311–312. ISBN 978-90-04-12756-2.
- Hillenbrand, Carole, ed. (1989). The History of al-Ṭabarī, Volume XXVI: The Waning of the Umayyad Caliphate: Prelude to Revolution, A.D. 738–744/A.H. 121–126. SUNY Series in Near Eastern Studies. Albany, New York: State University of New York Press. ISBN 978-0-88706-810-2.
- Hillenbrand, Robert (1994). Islamic Architecture: Form, Function and Meaning. New York: Columbia University Press. ISBN 0-231-10132-5.
- Hillenbrand, Robert (1999). "'Anjar and Early Islamic Urbanism". In Brogiolo, Gian Pietro; Ward-Perkins, Bryan (eds.). The Idea and Ideal of the Town between Late Antiquity and the Early Middle Ages. Leiden, Boston and Köln: Brill. pp. 59–98. ISBN 90-04-10901-3.
- Hinds, Martin, ed. (1990). The History of al-Ṭabarī, Volume XXIII: The Zenith of the Marwānid House: The Last Years of ʿAbd al-Malik and the Caliphate of al-Walīd, A.D. 700–715/A.H. 81–95. SUNY Series in Near Eastern Studies. Albany, New York: State University of New York Press. ISBN 978-0-88706-721-1.
- Kaegi, Walter E. (2010). Muslim Expansion and Byzantine Collapse in North Africa. Cambridge: Cambridge University Press. ISBN 978-0-521-19677-2.
- Kennedy, Hugh (1998). "Egypt as a Province in the Islamic Caliphate, 641–868". In Petry, Carl F. (ed.). The Cambridge History of Egypt: Islamic Egypt, 640–1517. Vol. 1. Cambridge: Cambridge University Press. pp. 62–85. ISBN 0-521-47137-0.
- Kennedy, Hugh (2001). The Armies of the Caliphs: Military and Society in the Early Islamic State. London and New York: Routledge. ISBN 0-415-25093-5.
- Kennedy, Hugh (2002). "al-Walīd (I)". In Bearman, P. J.; Bianquis, Th.; Bosworth, C. E.; van Donzel, E. & Heinrichs, W. P. (eds.). The Encyclopaedia of Islam, Second Edition. Volume XI: W–Z. Leiden: E. J. Brill. pp. 127–128. ISBN 978-90-04-12756-2.
- Kennedy, Hugh (2004) [1986]. The Prophet and the Age of the Caliphates: The Islamic Near East from the 6th to the 11th Century (Second ed.). Harlow: Longman. ISBN 978-0-582-40525-7.
- Lévi-Provençal, E. (1993). "Mūsā b. Nuṣayr". In Bosworth, C. E.; van Donzel, E.; Heinrichs, W. P. & Pellat, Ch. (eds.). The Encyclopaedia of Islam, Second Edition. Volume VII: Mif–Naz. Leiden: E. J. Brill. pp. 643–644. ISBN 978-90-04-09419-2.
- Lilie, Ralph-Johannes (1976). Die byzantinische Reaktion auf die Ausbreitung der Araber. Studien zur Strukturwandlung des byzantinischen Staates im 7. und 8. Jhd (in German). Munich: Institut für Byzantinistik und Neugriechische Philologie der Universität München. OCLC 797598069.
- Marsham, Andrew (2009). The Rituals of Islamic Monarchy: Accession and Succession in the First Muslim Empire. Edinburgh: Edinburgh University Press. ISBN 978-0-7486-2512-3.
- Marsham, Andrew (2022). "Kinship, Dynasty, and the Umayyads". In Osti, Letizia; van Berkel, Maaike (eds.). The Historian of Islam at Work: Essays in Honor of Hugh N. Kennedy. Leiden: Brill. pp. 12–45. ISBN 978-90-04-52523-8.
- McMillan, M. E. (2011). The Meaning of Mecca: The Politics of Pilgrimage in Early Islam. London: Saqi Books. ISBN 978-0-86356-895-4.
- Munt, Harry (2014). The Holy City of Medina: Sacred Space in Early Islamic Arabia. New York: Cambridge University Press. ISBN 978-1-107-04213-1.
- Powers, David S., ed. (1989). The History of al-Ṭabarī, Volume XXIV: The Empire in Transition: The Caliphates of Sulaymān, ʿUmar, and Yazīd, A.D. 715–724/A.H. 96–105. SUNY Series in Near Eastern Studies. Albany, New York: State University of New York Press. ISBN 978-0-7914-0072-2.
- Ragab, Ahmed (2015). The Medieval Islamic Hospital: Medicine, Religion, and Charity. Cambridge University Press. ISBN 978-1-107-10960-5.
- Robinson, Chase F. (2010). "The Violence of the Abbasid Revolution". In Suleiman, Yasir (ed.). Living Islamic History: Studies in Honour of Professor Carole Hillenbrand. Edinburgh: Edinburgh University Press. pp. 226–251. ISBN 978-0-7486-3738-6.
- Rowson, Everett K., ed. (1989). The History of al-Ṭabarī, Volume XXII: The Marwānid Restoration: The Caliphate of ʿAbd al-Malik, A.D. 693–701/A.H. 74–81. SUNY Series in Near Eastern Studies. Albany, New York: State University of New York Press. ISBN 978-0-88706-975-8.
- Scales, Peter C. (1994). The Fall of the Caliphate of Cordoba: Berbers and Andalusis in Conflict. Leiden, Boston and Köln: Brill. ISBN 90-04-09868-2.
- Shaban, M. A. (1971). Islamic History: Volume 1, AD 600–750 (AH 132): A New Interpretation. Cambridge: Cambridge University Press. ISBN 978-0-521-08137-5.
- Treadgold, Warren (1997). A History of the Byzantine State and Society. Stanford, California: Stanford University Press. ISBN 0-8047-2630-2.
- Uzquiza Bartolomé, Aránzazu (1994). "Otros Linajes Omeyas en al-Andalus". In Marín, Manuela (ed.). Estudios onomástico-biográficos de al-Andalus: VI (in Spanish). Madrid: Consejo Superior de Investigaciones Científicas. pp. 445–462. ISBN 84-00-07415-7.
- Wellhausen, Julius (1927). The Arab Kingdom and Its Fall. Translated by Margaret Graham Weir. Calcutta: University of Calcutta.
- Yavuz, Yildirim (1996). "The Restoration Project of the Masjid al-Aqsa by Mïmar Kemalettın (1922–26)". Muqarnas. 13: 149–164. JSTOR 1523257.
- Dunlop, D.M. (1960). "Bīmāristān; i. Early period and Muslim East.". In Gibb, H. A. R.; Kramers, J. H.; Lévi-Provençal, E.; Schacht, J.; Lewis, B. & Pellat, Ch. (eds.). The Encyclopaedia of Islam, Second Edition. Volume I: A–B. Leiden: E. J. Brill. OCLC 495469456.
- Dols, Michael W. (1987). "The Origins of the Islamic Hospital: Myth and Reality". Bulletin of the History of Medicine. 61 (3): 378. ISSN 0007-5140.
- Casares, J.; Amarillo, S. Dominguez (2020). Islamic Heritage Architecture and Art III. WIT Press. ISBN 978-1-78466-393-3.
- McMillan, M. (2013). Fathers and Sons: The Rise and Fall of Political Dynasty in the Middle East. Springer. ISBN 978-1-137-29789-1.
- Conrad, Lawrence (1994). "Did al-Walid I Found the First Islamic Hospital?". Aram. 6.

al-Walid I Umayyad Dynasty Born: c. 674 Died: 23 February 715
Preceded by Abd al-Malik	Caliph of Islam; Umayyad Caliph; 705 – 23 February 715	Succeeded by Sulayman
