= Bishr ibn al-Walid =

Umayyad prince, General and Amir al-hajj

Bishr ibn al-Walid بشر بن الوليد
- Died: after 745; Syria, Umayyad Caliphate
- Spouse: Sa'da bint Sa'id ibn Khalid ibn Amr ibn Uthman
Names
- Bishr ibn al-Walid ibn Abd al-Malik
- Dynasty: Umayyad
- Father: Al-Walid I
- Religion: Islam
- Occupation: Scholar
- Military career
- Relatives: Sulayman (uncle); Yazid II (uncle); Hisham (uncle); Maslama (uncle)
- Allegiance: Umayyad Caliphate
- Rank: General
- Conflicts: Arab–Byzantine wars

Bishr ibn al-Walīd ibn ʿAbd al-Malik (Arabic: بشر بن الوليد) (fl. 710–740s) was an Umayyad prince and commander who led military expeditions against the Byzantine Empire in 710/11 and 714/15 and later participated in the Umayyad opposition against his kinsman, Caliph al-Walid II (r. 743–744). He was imprisoned by his erstwhile ally and kinsman, Caliph Marwan II, in 745 and presumably died in incarceration.

== Life ==
Bishr was a son of the Umayyad caliph al-Walid I (r. 705–715). During his father's reign, he led raids against the Byzantine Empire along the caliphate's northern frontier, including in 710/11 and the winter of 714/15. In 714, he was appointed amir al-hajj by his father, putting him in charge of the Hajj pilgrimage to Mecca. Due to his high education, he was dubbed ʿalim Banū Marwān (lit. 'scholar of the Marwanids', i.e. the ruling house of the Umayyad dynasty). Bishr returned to Syria after his father's death in early 715, according to 8th/9th-century historian al-Waqidi.

He is not mentioned again in the medieval sources until 743/44 when he became involved in the Third Muslim Civil War. In this struggle over the caliphate between the Umayyads, he fought against his cousin, Caliph al-Walid II, in support of his brother, Yazid III, despite warnings from his other brother and prominent wartime general, al-Abbas, to remain neutral. Twelve other brothers of Bishr likewise supported Yazid III, who went on to become caliph after al-Walid II's assassination in 744. Bishr married the divorced wife of al-Walid II, Sa'da, who was the daughter of a wealthy descendant of Caliph Uthman (r. 644–656), Sa'id ibn Khalid ibn Amr ibn Uthman.

Yazid III ruled for a few months before dying and being succeeded by his brother Ibrahim, who months later, in 745, surrendered the caliphate to Marwan II. At the time of the latter's accession, Bishr had been serving as governor of Jund Qinnasrin (military district of Qinnasrin) in northern Syria. Marwan II subsequently compelled the largely Qaysi troops of Qinnasrin to arrest and hand over Bishr and the latter's full brother Masrur who became captives. They are not heard of again and are assumed to have died in prison.

== Bibliography ==
- Hillenbrand, Carole, ed. (1989). The History of al-Ṭabarī, Volume XXVI: The Waning of the Umayyad Caliphate: Prelude to Revolution, A.D. 738–744/A.H. 121–126. SUNY Series in Near Eastern Studies. Albany, New York: State University of New York Press. ISBN 978-0-88706-810-2.
- Hinds, Martin, ed. (1990). The History of al-Ṭabarī, Volume XXIII: The Zenith of the Marwānid House: The Last Years of ʿAbd al-Malik and the Caliphate of al-Walīd, A.D. 700–715/A.H. 81–95. SUNY Series in Near Eastern Studies. Albany, New York: State University of New York Press. ISBN 978-0-88706-721-1.
- Lammens, Henri (1993) [1913–1938]. "Bishr b. al-Walīd". E. J. Brill's First Encyclopaedia of Islam 1913-1936, Volume II Bābā Fighānī – Dwīn. pp. 731–732.
- Vaglieri, L. Veccia (1960). "Bishr b. al-Walīd". In Gibb, H. A. R.; Kramers, J. H.; Lévi-Provençal, E.; Schacht, J.; Lewis, B. & Pellat, Ch. (eds.). The Encyclopaedia of Islam, Second Edition. Volume I: A–B. Leiden: E. J. Brill. p. 1244. OCLC 495469456.
