= Yazid III =

Umayyad caliph in 744

Yazid III يزيد بن الوليد
- Amir al-Mu'minin
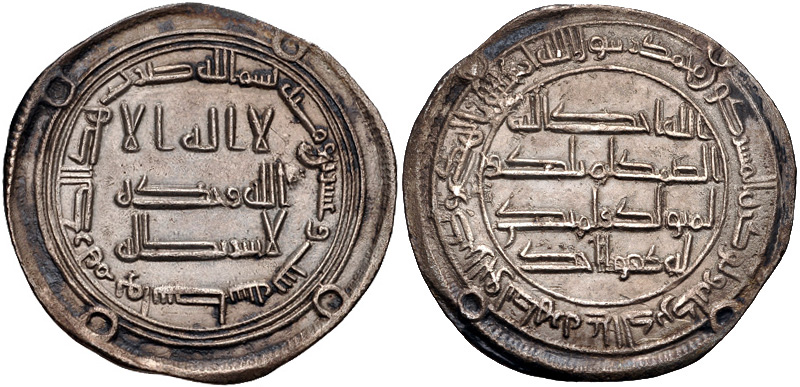
- Dirham of Yazid III

12th Caliph of the Umayyad Caliphate
- Reign: 17 April 744 – 4 October 744
- Predecessor: Walid ibn Yazid
- Successor: Ibrahim ibn al-Walid
- Born: 701; Damascus, Bilad al-Sham, Umayyad Caliphate
- Died: 4 October 744 (aged 43); Damascus, Umayyad Caliphate
- House: Marwanid
- Dynasty: Umayyad
- Father: Al-Walid I
- Mother: Shah-i-Afrid bint Peroz III
- Religion: Islam

Yazid ibn al-Walid ibn Abd al-Malik (Arabic: يزيد بن الوليد بن عبد الملك, romanized: Yazīd ibn al-Walīd ibn ʿAbd al-Malik; 701 – 3/4 October 744), commonly known as Yazid III, was the twelfth Umayyad caliph, ruling from 744 until his death months later.

== Early life ==
Yazid was the member of the influential Umayyad dynasty. His father, al-Walid was survived by several sons: al-Ya'qubi names sixteen, while historian al-Tabari (d. 923) names nineteen. Yazid III was the grandson of the great Umayyad Caliph Abd al-Malik Ibn Marwan and his grand mother was Wallada bint al-Abbas ibn al-Jaz al-Absiyya.

Yazid was the son of a Persian princess who had been given as a concubine to Caliph al-Walid I. His mother was Shah-i Afrid, a daughter of Peroz. Al-Tabari quotes a couplet of Yazid's on his own ancestry:

I am the son of Chosroes, my ancestor was Marwan,
Caesar was my grandsire and my grandsire was Khagan.

Tabari further records descriptions of Yazid as being tall and handsome.

=== Role in the downfall of Al-Walid ===
During the reign of his cousin al-Walid II, Yazid spoke out against Walid's "immorality" which included discrimination on behalf of the Banu Qays Arabs against Yemenis and non-Arab Muslims, and Yazid received further support from the Qadariya and Murji'iya (believers in human free will). Yazid slipped into Damascus and deposed Walid in a coup, following this up with a disbursement of funds from the treasury.

According to Yazid's own account, Yazid sent Abd al-Aziz ibn al-Hajjaj ibn Abd al-Malik to meet Walid at Al-Bakhra. 'Abd al-Aziz offered to set up a tribal assembly (shura) to decide the future of the realm. Walid rejected this offer and attacked, by which action he lost his life. Yazid had Walid's head hoisted "on a lance and paraded around Damascus"; Yazid then imprisoned Walid's sons 'Uthman and Hakam, whom Walid had designated as his heirs.

== Reign ==
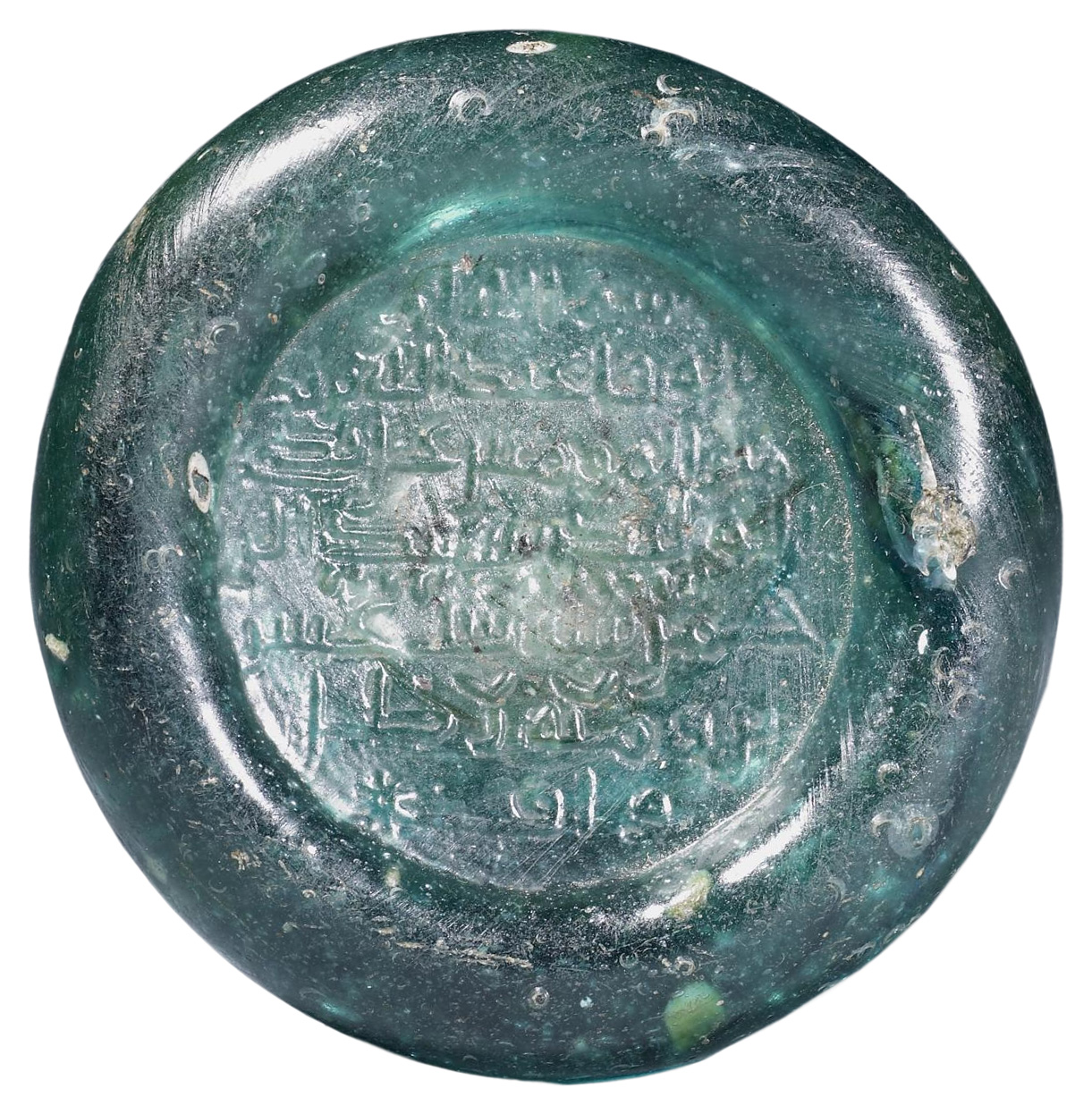
Pound weight's inscription, stamped on top in an angular script known as kufic, evokes Yazid III.

On accession, Yazid explained that he had rebelled on behalf of the Book of Allah and the Sunna of His Prophet, and that this entailed ensuring that the strong not prey upon the weak. He promised "to engage in no building works, squander no money on wives or children, transfer no money from one province to another" without reason, "keep no troops on the field too long", and not to overtax the ahl al-dhimma; instead, he would eschew discrimination and would make his payments on time. He promised abdication if he failed to meet these goals, and held in principle to al-amr shura – to an elected caliphate.

To shore up political support across the provinces following his coup, Yazid pursued a strategy of expanding state patronage. He ordered his representatives in Egypt to enlarge the military payroll, adding thirty thousand new fighters to the registry, which successfully secured the loyalty of the Egyptian Arab garrison for his regime.

Tabari records Yazid's nickname "the Diminisher" (Naqis), given because he reduced military annuities by 10%, whereas his predecessor had promised a raise. According to Islamic popular tradition, recorded in an apocalyptic style, Yazid would go himself into the marketplace.

The city of Homs refused allegiance to Yazid, and there were several other dissident movements against him. Another cousin, Marwan ibn Muhammad, governor of Armenia, had initially supported Walid and on Walid's death entered Iraq to avenge him. Marwan eventually rallied around Yazid.

=== Administration of Yazid III ===
Yazid appointed Mansur ibn Jumhur to replace Yusuf ibn 'Umar as governor of Iraq. On May 15, Yazid wrote a letter, preserved from oral sources in al-Mada'ini (reproduced in Tabari) and in al-Baladhuri. It supports the Umayyad dynasty up to but not including "the enemy of Allah" al-Walid II, at which point it lays out Yazid's version of the event at al-Bakhra'. At the end, Tabari's rendition has Yazid exhorting the Iraqis to follow Mansur ibn Jumhur.

Yusuf ibn 'Umar was subsequently imprisoned and later killed by the son of Khalid ibn 'Abdallah al-Qasri. Mansur attempted to dismiss the Khurasani governor Nasr ibn Sayyar, but Nasr refused to accept this. Facing opposition from Juday al-Kirmani, Nasr invited al-Harith ibn Surayj to return from his thirteen-year stay in Turgesh territory. Al-Harith arrived wearing a fine suit of armour the Khaqan had given him and gained the support of many people in Khurasan.

== Death ==
Yazid ruled the Umayyad Caliphate from April 744 to 4 October 744. Yazid named his brother Ibrahim as his successor. Yazid fell ill of a brain tumour and died on October 3 or 4, 744. Ibrahim duly succeeded him.

== See also ==
- Umar ibn al-Walid, an Umayyad prince and a military leader
- Abd al-Aziz ibn al-Walid, an Umayyad prince and a military leader
- Al-Abbas ibn al-Walid, an Umayyad prince and a military general
- Bishr ibn al-Walid, an Umayyad prince and a military general
- Sulayman ibn Hisham, an Umayyad military general and cousin of Yazid III

Yazid III Umayyad Dynasty Born: 701 Died: October 3 or 4, 744
Sunni Islam titles
Preceded by Walid ibn Yazid	Caliph of Islam; Umayyad Caliph; April 15 to October 3 or 4, 744	Succeeded by Ibrahim ibn al-Walid
