= Ibrahim ibn al-Walid =

13th and penultimate Umayyad caliph in 744

Ibrahim ibn al-Walid إبراهيم ابن الوليد
- Khalīfah; Amir al-Mu'minin
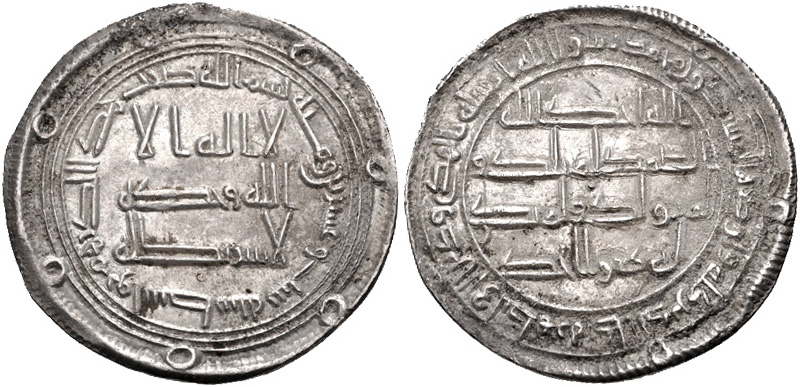
- Dirham of Ibrahim ibn Al-Walid

13th Caliph of the Umayyad Caliphate
- Reign: 4 October 744 – 4 December 744
- Predecessor: Yazid III
- Successor: Marwan II
- Born: Damascus
- Died: 25 January 750; Bilad al-Sham
- Issue: Ishaq
Names
- Abū Isḥāq Ibrāhīm ibn al-Walīd ibn ʿAbd al-Malik أبو إسحاق إبراهيم بن الوليد بن عبد الملك
- House: Marwanid
- Dynasty: Umayyad
- Father: Al-Walid I
- Mother: Budayra (or Su'ar)
- Religion: Islam

Ibrahim ibn al-Walid (Arabic: ابراهيم ابن الوليد بن عبد الملك, romanized: Ibrāhīm ibn al-Walīd ibn ʿAbd al-Malik; died 25 January 750) was the penultimate Umayyad caliph, ruling for a few months in late 744.

== Biography ==
Ibrahim was a son of the Umayyad caliph al-Walid I (r. 705–715) through a concubine Su'ar (or Budayra in other sources). In April 744, his half-brother Yazid III usurped their cousin Al-Walid II in a palace coup. Al-Walid II was killed, and his two sons and designated heirs were imprisoned. The Umayyad factions loyal to al-Walid revolted against Yazid III and marched on Damascus. However, they were defeated by Yazid's cousin, Sulayman ibn Hisham.

After taking power, Yazid III designated Ibrahim as his successor. His reign was cut short when he died of a brain tumor on 4 October 744. Ibrahim's succession intensified the ongoing Third Fitna as the powerful governor of al-Jazira, Marwan II ibn Muhammad, revolted in the name of Al-Walid II's imprisoned sons and marched on Damascus. Ibrahim sent Sulayman, who met Marwan near Baalbek with his personal army. He was defeated however, and retreated to Damascus. After having Al-Walid II's sons executed, Sulayman and Ibrahim fled to Palmyra. Marwan II entered Damascus peacefully and was proclaimed caliph. He announced a conciliatory policy, after which Ibrahim and Sulayman returned to Damascus and submitted to Marwan II.

Marwan II's rule was plagued with revolts, and soon the Abbasid revolution began in the distant province of Khurasan. In January 750, he was decisively defeated at the Battle of Zab, and fled to Egypt, where he was executed. The victorious Abbasids took over the caliphate, and began a violent purge of the Umayyad family members, in which Ibrahim was also executed.

== See also ==
- Umar ibn al-Walid
- Abd al-Aziz ibn al-Walid
- Al-Abbas ibn al-Walid
- Bishr ibn al-Walid

== Bibliography ==
- Biesterfeldt, Hinrich; Günther, Sebastian (2018). The Works of Ibn Wāḍiḥ al-Yaʿqūbī (Volume 3): An English Translation. Leiden: Brill. ISBN 978-90-04-35621-4.
- Blankinship, Khalid Yahya (1994). The End of the Jihâd State: The Reign of Hishām ibn ʻAbd al-Malik and the Collapse of the Umayyads. Albany, New York: State University of New York Press. ISBN 978-0-7914-1827-7.
- Hawting, Gerald R. (2000). The First Dynasty of Islam: The Umayyad Caliphate AD 661–750 (Second ed.). London and New York: Routledge. ISBN 0-415-24072-7.
- Hillenbrand, Carole, ed. (1989). The History of al-Ṭabarī, Volume XXVI: The Waning of the Umayyad Caliphate: Prelude to Revolution, A.D. 738–744/A.H. 121–126. SUNY Series in Near Eastern Studies. Albany, New York: State University of New York Press. ISBN 978-0-88706-810-2.
- Hinds, Martin, ed. (1990). The History of al-Ṭabarī, Volume XXIII: The Zenith of the Marwānid House: The Last Years of ʿAbd al-Malik and the Caliphate of al-Walīd, A.D. 700–715/A.H. 81–95. SUNY Series in Near Eastern Studies. Albany, New York: State University of New York Press. ISBN 978-0-88706-721-1.
- Judd, Steven C. (2019). "Ibrāhīm b. al-Walīd". In Fleet, Kate; Krämer, Gudrun; Matringe, Denis; Nawas, John; Rowson, Everett (eds.). Encyclopaedia of Islam (3rd ed.). Brill Online. doi:10.1163/1573-3912_ei3_COM_3234. ISSN 1873-9830.
- Lilie, Ralph-Johannes; Ludwig, Claudia; Pratsch, Thomas; Zielke, Beate (2001). "Sulaimān ibn Hišām (# 7162)". Prosopographie der mittelbyzantinischen Zeit: 1. Abteilung (641–867), Band 4: Platon (# 6266) – Theophylaktos (# 8345) (in German). Berlin and Boston: De Gruyter. p. 284. ISBN 978-3-11-016674-3.
- Williams, John Alden, ed. (1985). The History of al-Ṭabarī, Volume XXVII: The ʿAbbāsid Revolution, A.D. 743–750/A.H. 126–132. SUNY Series in Near Eastern Studies. Albany, New York: State University of New York Press. ISBN 978-0-87395-884-4.

Ibrahim ibn al-Walid Umayyad Dynasty Born: - Died: 25 January 750
Sunni Islam titles
Preceded by Yazid III ibn al-Walid ibn 'Abd al-Malik	Caliph of Islam; Umayyad Caliph; 4 October 744 – 4 December 744	Succeeded by Marwan II ibn Muhammad ibn Marwan
