= Bab al-Faradis =

Ancient city gate of Damascus, Syria

Coordinates: 33°30′49.5″N 36°18′24″E

Bab al-Faradis (Arabic: بَابُ الْفَرَادِيسِ, romanized: Bāb al-Farādīs; "The Gate of the Paradises") or Bab al-Amara is one of the seven ancient city-gates of Damascus, Syria. The other name, Bab Al-Amara, refers to a name of a district in the old city where people in the 14th century would meet. During the Roman era, the gate was dedicated to Mercury.
