= Al-Sulami (disambiguation) =

Al-Sulami (947–1034) was a writer from Khorasan.

Al-Sulami may also refer to:

- any member of the tribe Banu Sulaym
- Ibn Abi al-Awja al-Sulami, who led the Expedition of Ibn Abi al-Awja al-Sulami in 628
- Qays ibn al-Haytham al-Sulami (fl. 649–684), Arab governor
- Umayr ibn al-Hubab al-Sulami (died 689), chief of the Banu Sulaym
- Abd Allah ibn Khazim al-Sulami (died 692), governor of Khorasan
- Abu Abd al-Rahman Abd Allah ibn Habib al-Sulami (died c. 693), traditionist
- Asid ibn Zafir al-Sulami (early 8th century), Arab general
- Yazid ibn Asid ibn Zafir al-Sulami (fl. c. 750–780), Arab general
- Ali ibn Tahir al-Sulami (died 1106), Damascene jurist
- Ahmed Al-Sulami (born 1983), Saudi footballer
