= Bajadda =

Former town in Balikh River valley, Syria

Bājaddā was a small town in the Balikh River valley inhabited during the early Islamic period. It is identified with the present-day Khirbat al-Anbār, located a few kilometers south of the contemporary town of Hisn Maslama.

== Geography ==
The site measures 800x700 m in size and consists of a low mound with a flat top, which suggests that there was only one main building phase. It has not been explored by archaeologists; the only monument visible from the surface is a large dome that may cover an underground cistern or well.

== History ==
The name "Bajadda" is Syriac, probably indicating a local Syriac-speaking population. The town was the place of origin of the Banu Taymiyya family of Hanbali scholars. According to Ahmad ibn al-Tayyib al-Sarakhsi, who visited the Balikh valley in 884-5, Bajadda had originally formed part of the Umayyad general Maslama ibn Abd al-Malik's landed estates in the region. Maslama then granted it to a lieutenant of his, Usayd al-Sulamī, who built the small town up and fortified it with a wall. Sarakhsi wrote that there was a spring in Bajadda that provided water for drinking and agriculture; this spring may be under the dome. Bajadda was probably flourishing in the 880s when Sarakhsi visited. Some possible 12th/13th-century pottery fragments have also been found at the site, indicating that the town may have still existed then.

== See also ==
- Hisn Maslama
- Tall Mahra
- al-Jarud
- Bajarwan (Syria)
