= Hisn Maslama =

Ḥiṣn Maslama ("the fort of Maslama") was a small city in the upper Balikh River valley that was inhabited during the early Islamic period. It was located at the present-day ruin site of Madīnat al-Fār, located 6 km east of the Balikh river near its junction with the Wadi Hamar. The site consists of a northern enclosure and a southern extension. Originally founded as a rural estate by the Umayyad general Maslama ibn Abd al-Malik in the 700s, it expanded significantly during the Abbasid period and grew into a small city.

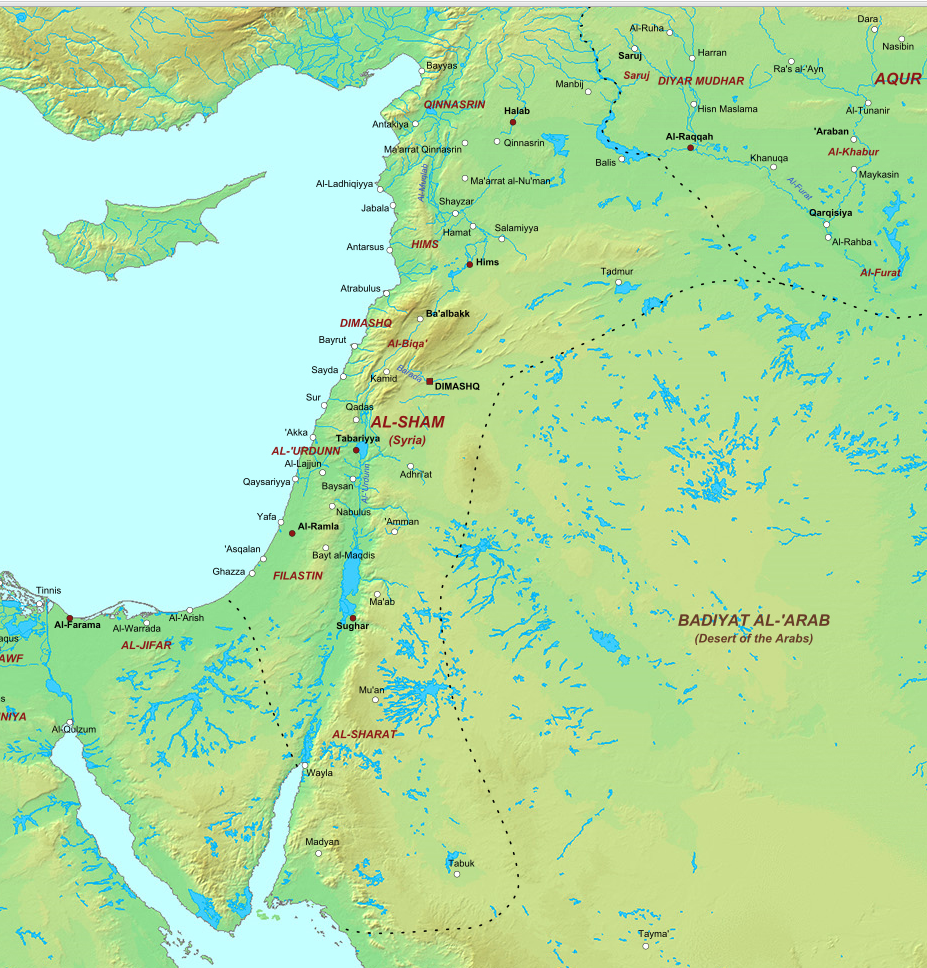
Location map Hisn Maslama is located in Diyar Mudar

No coins from Maslama's lifetime have been found at Hisn Maslama – he died in 738, and the earliest coin finds are from the 740s. This is probably because Hisn Maslama was then a self-sufficient rural estate that had no need for local markets and therefore coins. Hisn Maslama itself was probably the administrative center of Maslama's rural estates in the region, and when he retired from military service in 732 he probably came here. The nearby small town of Bajadda to the south was granted by Maslama to one of his retainers around this time. Architectural remains from the Umayyad period at Hisn Maslama are limited, consisting only of some construction beneath the central building in the site's northern enclosure.

Under the Abbasids, the nature of Hisn Maslama changed from a rural estate to an urban settlement with a market economy using coins for everyday transactions. As a result, coin finds are continuous until the 9th century. The reason for Hisn Maslama's expansion, like other settlements in the area, is probably because Harun al-Rashid moved his court to Raqqa in 796, which created a new demand for agricultural produce and stimulated the region's economy in general. Hisn Maslama may have served as a way-station and had a garrison during this time.

The northern part of early Abbasid Hisn Maslama was enclosed by square city walls, 330x330m in length with projecting half-towers similar to the ones at Tall Mahra and al-Jarud. These towers served almost no defensive purpose and instead seem to have been built as "symbols of urban pride and wealth in [a] small rural town". Within the walls, the streets followed a rectilinear pattern and were lined by houses with courtyards. A central building, on top of the earlier Umayyad remains, also dates from this period. To the south of the north enclosure was a trapezoid-shaped extension, itself partly walled and probably also built during the early Abbasid period. Structures identified in this area include a small bathhouse, a necropolis with an associated religious building, and an ornate building dated to the reign of Harun al-Rashid. Hisn Maslama was provided with water from the Balikh by a canal, and large cisterns found at the site were probably used to store this water.

The latest evidence of Hisn Maslama's occupation is in the late 9th century. A single fragment of a counterfeit dirham of Nasibin, dated to 886-7, is the latest archaeological evidence. At about the same time, the author Ahmad ibn al-Tayyib al-Sarakhsi visited Hisn Maslama in 884-5 and left a short description of the town. Most likely, the reason for Hisn Maslama's decline was the political instability in the region: the Abbasid-Tulunid wars in the 880s and then conflict with the Shi'i Qarmatians in following years had a serious impact on the region. The rule of the Hamdanids was also devastating; after they took Raqqa in 942, it no longer served as a garrison city for the Abbasids, and the loss of the soldiers and their disposable income meant that economic activity decreased in general. Then with the immigration of the nomadic Banu Numayr in the mid-9th century, the irrigated agricultural base of the region was largely displaced with nomadic pastoralism and the monetary economy shrank dramatically to the lowest level since ancient times.

Although the place name element "Hisn" (meaning "fortified place") was often omitted by contemporary authors (such as Hisn al-Tinat, "the castle of the figs", which al-Muqaddasi refers to as simply "Tinat"), Hisn Maslama was always referred to by its full name. This is probably because if the "Hisn" part got dropped, then it would just be a person's name, Maslama, which would have been confusing. Hisn Mansur was another place that followed a similar pattern.

== See also ==
- Tall Mahra
- al-Jarud
- Bajadda
- Bajarwan (Syria)
