= Tell Zeidan =

Archaeological site in Syria

- تل زيدان (Arabic)
- Location within Syria Location within Near East
- 36°00′N 39°06′E
- Type: tell, archaeological site
- Periods: Neolithic, Ubaid period, Halaf culture, Late Chalcolithic in Greater Mesopotamia
- Location: Raqqa Governorate, Syria

Site notes
- Height: 15 metre
- Length: 600 metre
- Width: 200 metre
- Area: 12.5 hectare
- Excavation dates: 2008; 2009
- Archaeologists: Anas al-Khabour, Muhammad Sarhan, Gil Stein

Tell Zeidan is an archaeological site of the Ubaid culture in northern Syria, dates from between 6000 and 4000 BC. The dig consists of three large mounds on the east bank of the Balikh River, slightly north of its confluence with the Euphrates River, and is located about 5 km (3.1 mi) east of the modern Syrian city of Raqqa (or Raqqa). This site is included within the historical region known as Mesopotamia and the Tigris-Euphrates river system, often called the Cradle of Civilization.

== Archaeology ==
The site, with three submounds, covers an area of about 12.5 hectares.

An international archaeological project, the Joint Syrian-American Archaeological Research Project at Tell Zeidan, were surveying and excavating the Tell Zeidan site. The project started in 2008, two seasons were completed. The third season was scheduled to start in July 2010. Muhammad Sarhan, director of the Raqqa Museum, and Gil Stein, director of the Oriental Institute of the University of Chicago, are co-directors of the project.

Part of the mound appears to have been looted after the start of the Syrian civil war in 2011.

== See also ==
- Cities of the ancient Near East
