= Bajarwan (Syria) =

Bājarwān was a small town or village in the Balikh River valley inhabited during the early Islamic period, located between Raqqa and Tall Mahra. It is attested in textual sources until the 10th century and probably peaked during the early Abbasid period, in the late 8th/early 9th centuries. Karin Bartl has identified it with the present-day sites of Tall Dāmir al-Sharqī and Tall Dāmir al-Gharbī on opposite sides of the river. Neither one has been explored by archaeologists.

== See also ==
- Hisn Maslama
- Tall Mahra
- al-Jarud
- Bajadda
