= Raqqa =

Raqqa ٱلرَّقَّة
- City
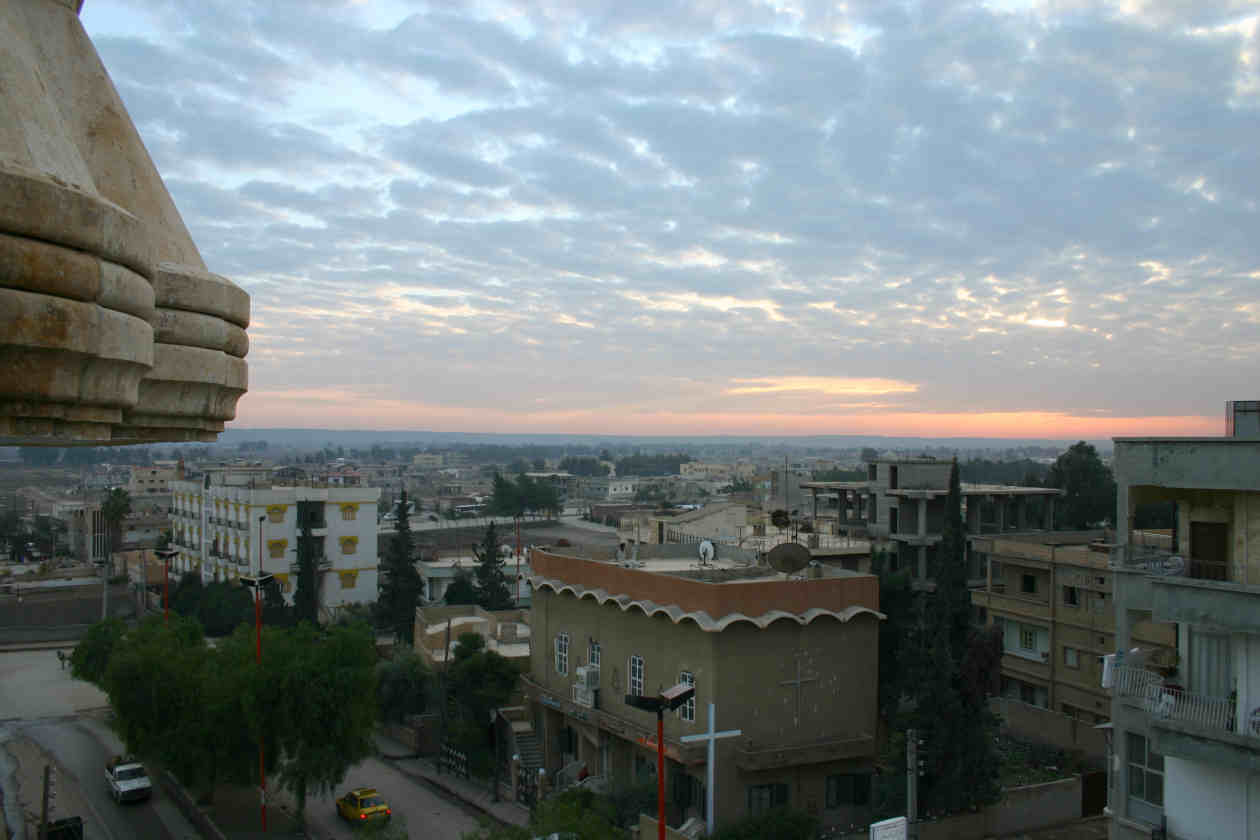
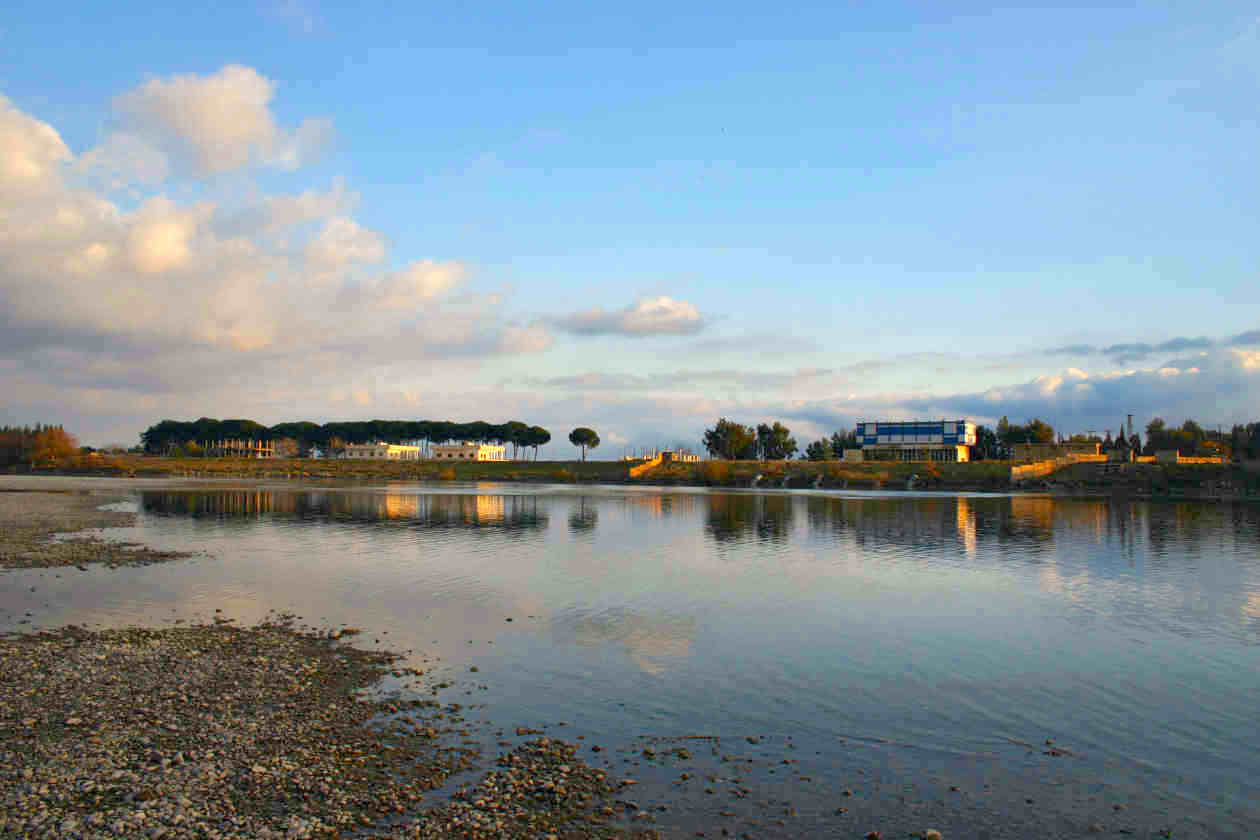
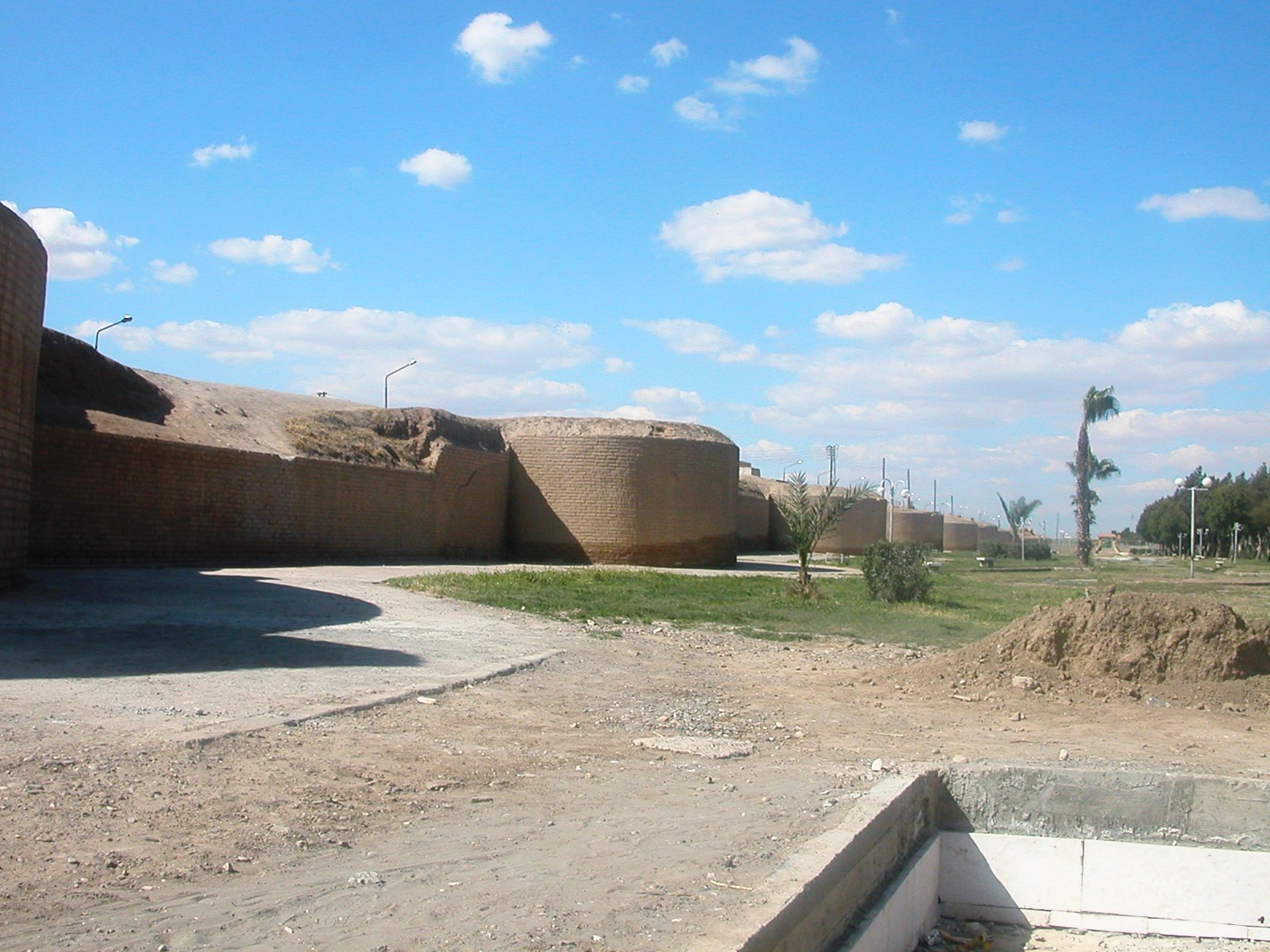
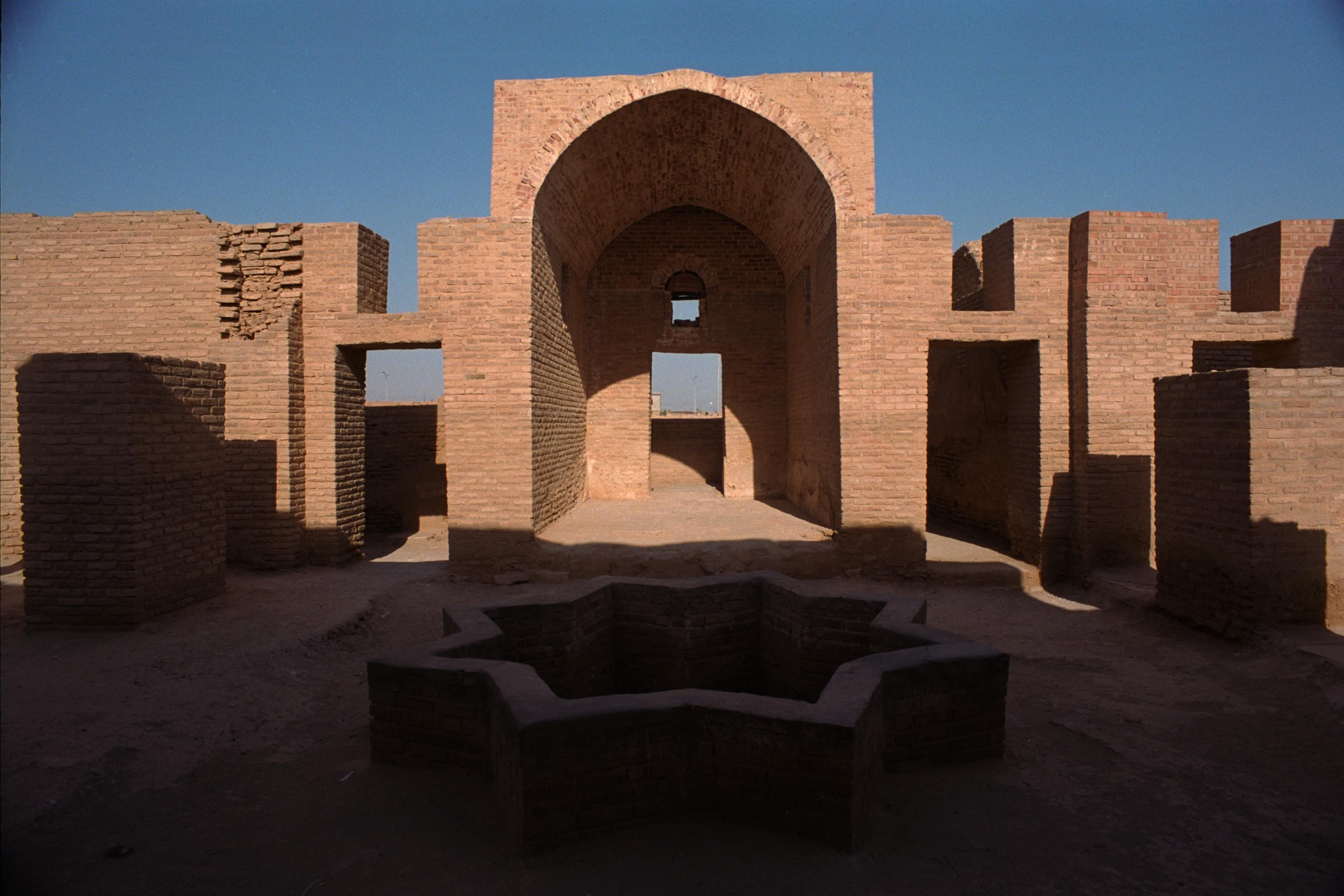
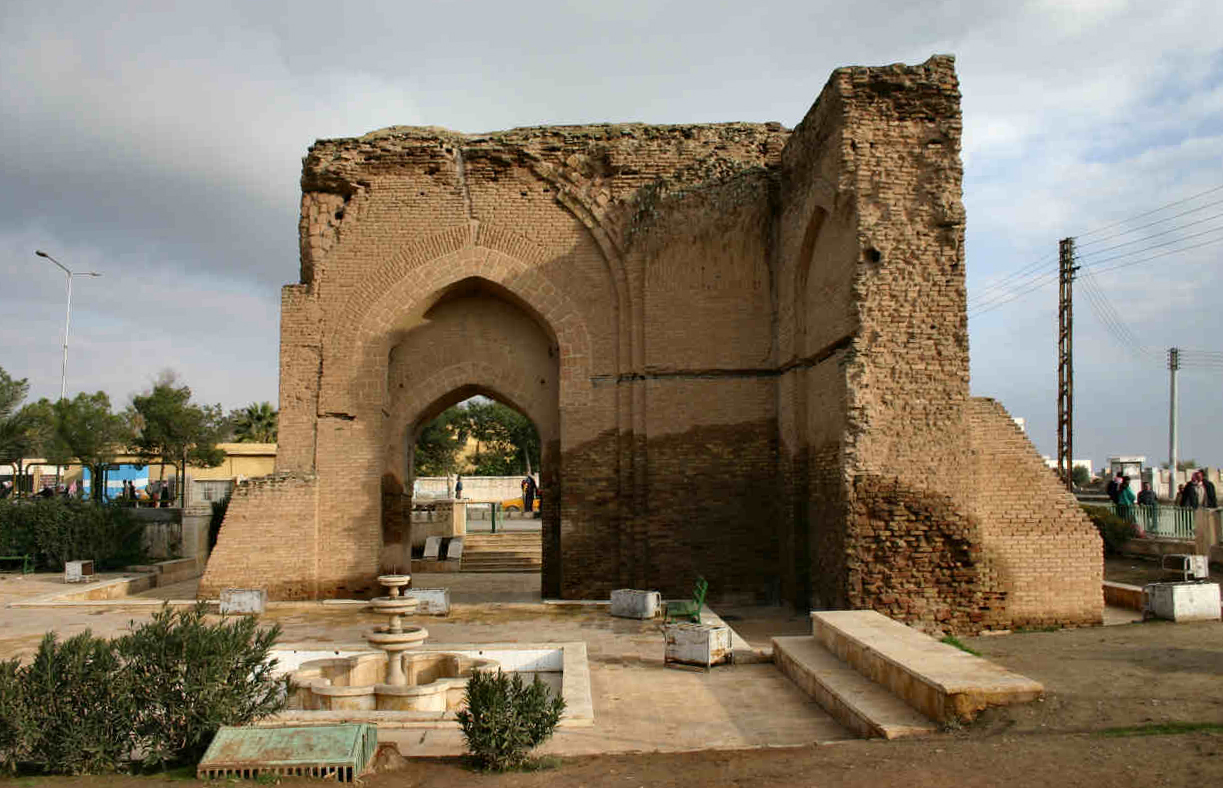
- Skyline Euphrates Abbasid city walls Qasr al-Banat Bab Baghdad Gate
- Interactive map of Raqqa
- Location of Raqqa within Syria Raqqa (Eastern Mediterranean) Raqqa (Asia)
- Coordinates: 35°57′N 39°01′E
- Country: Syria
- Governorate: Raqqa
- District: Raqqa
- Subdistrict: Raqqa
- Founded: 244–242 BC

Area
  - City: 35 km^{2} (14 sq mi)
- Elevation: 245 m (804 ft)

Population (2004)
  - City: 220,488
  - Estimate (2026): 416,138
  - Rank: 6th in Syria
  - Density: 6,300/km^{2} (16,000/sq mi)
  - Urban: 637,000
  - Metro: 843,596
- Demonym: Raqqawi (رقاوي)
- Time zone: UTC+3 (AST)
- P-Code: C5710
- Area code: 22
- Geocode: SY110100

Raqqa (Arabic: ٱلرَّقَّة, romanized: ar-Raqqah, also al-Raḳḳa) is a city in Syria on the north bank of the Euphrates River, about 160 kilometres (99 miles) east of Aleppo. It is located 40 kilometres (25 miles) east of the Euphrates Dam, Syria's largest dam. The Hellenistic, Roman, and Byzantine city and bishopric Callinicum (formerly a Latin and now a Maronite Catholic titular see) was the capital of the Abbasid Caliphate between 796 and 809, under the reign of Harun al-Rashid. It was also the capital of the Islamic State from 2014 to 2017. With a population of 531,952 based on the 2021 official census, Raqqa is the sixth largest city in Syria.

During the Syrian civil war, the city was captured in 2013 by the Syrian opposition and then by the Islamic State. The Islamic State made the city its capital in early 2014. As a result, the city was hit by airstrikes from the Syrian government, Russia, the United States, and several other countries. Most non-Sunni religious structures in the city were destroyed by the Islamic State, most notably the Shia Uwais al-Qarni Mosque, while others were converted into Sunni mosques. On 17 October 2017, following a lengthy battle that saw massive destruction to the city, the Syrian Democratic Forces (SDF) declared the liberation of Raqqa from the Islamic State to be complete. As of 2019, the Islamic State reportedly had no significant presence in the city or its surrounding areas. In January 2026, the city was recaptured by the Syrian armed forces from the SDF during the 2026 northeastern Syria offensive.

== History ==
=== Hellenistic Nikephorion and Kallinikos ===
The area of Raqqa has been inhabited since remote antiquity, as attested by the mounds (tells) of Tall Zaydan and Tall al-Bi'a, the latter being identified with the Babylonian city Tuttul.

The modern city traces its history to the Hellenistic period, with the foundation of the city of Nikephorion (Ancient Greek: Νικηφόριον, Latinized as Nicephorium). There are two versions regarding the establishment of the city. Pliny, in his Natural History, attributes its founding to Alexander the Great, citing the advantageous location as the rationale behind its establishment. Similarly, Isidore of Charax, in the Parthian Stations, also credits its foundation to Alexander. Conversely, Appian includes Nikephorion in a list of settlements he attributes to Seleucid King Seleucus I Nicator (reigned 301–281 BC). According to Tacitus, Nikephorion, alongside other cities like Anthemousias, was established by Macedonians and bore a Greek name.

The successor of Seleucus I, Seleucus II Callinicus (r. 246–225 BC), enlarged the city and renamed it after himself as Kallinikos (Καλλίνικος, Latinized as Callinicum).

According to Cassius Dio, during Crassus's preparations for his campaign against the Parthians in the mid-first century BCE, Nikephorion was among the Greek poleis that backed him.

=== Roman and Byzantine times ===
In Roman times, it was part of the Roman province of Osrhoene but had declined by the fourth century. Rebuilt by Byzantine Emperor Leo I (r. 457–474 AD) in 466, it was named Leontopolis (in Greek Λεοντόπολις or "city of Leo") after him, but the name Kallinikos prevailed. The city played an important role in the Byzantine Empire's relations with the Sasanian Empire, and the wars fought between them. By treaty, the city was recognized as one of the few official cross-border trading posts between the two empires, along with Nisibis and Artaxata.

The town was near the site of a Battle of Callinicum in 531 when the Sasanians tried to invade Roman territories, surprisingly via arid regions in Syria, to turn the tide of the Iberian War. The Persians won the battle, but the casualties on both sides were high. In 542, the city was destroyed by Emperor Khosrow I (r. 531–579), who razed its fortifications and deported its population to Persia, but it was subsequently rebuilt by Byzantine Emperor Justinian I (r. 527–565). In 580, during another war with Persia, the future Emperor Maurice scored a victory over the Persians near the city during his retreat from an abortive expedition to capture Ctesiphon.

In the last years before it came under Muslim rule, Kallinikos was as important as any other urban center in the region, and based on the physical area that it covered it was only slightly smaller than Damascus.

=== Early Islamic period ===
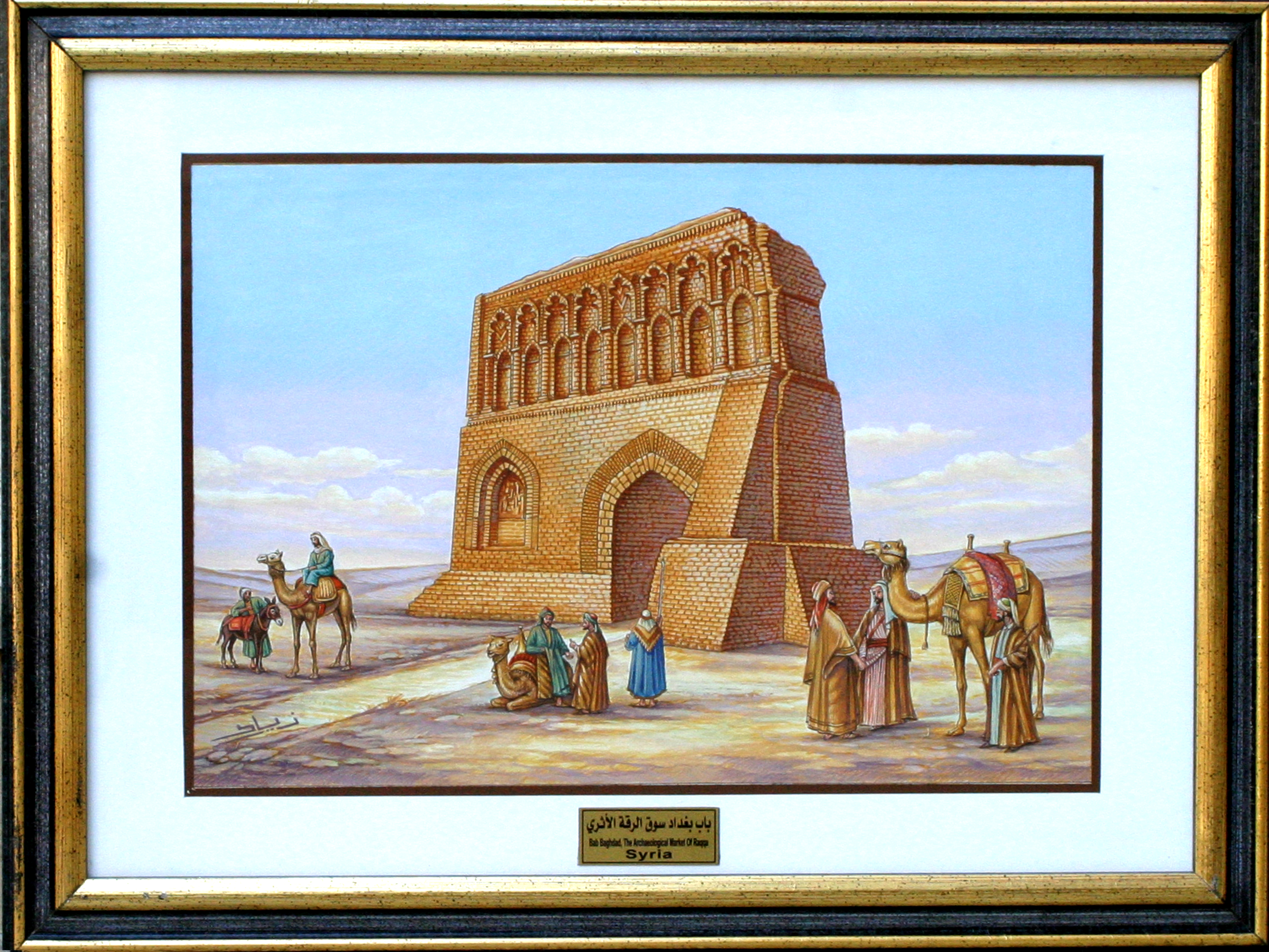
The Baghdad Gate, by Ziad Zukkari

In the year 639 or 640, the city fell to the Muslim conqueror Iyad ibn Ghanm. Since then, it has been known by the Arabic name al-Raqqah, or "the morass", after its marshy surroundings at the time. At the surrender of the city, the Christian inhabitants concluded a treaty with Ibn Ghanm that is quoted by al-Baladhuri. The treaty allowed them freedom of worship in their existing churches but forbade the construction of new ones. The city retained an active Christian community well into the Middle Ages (Michael the Syrian records 20 Syriac Orthodox (Jacobite) bishops from the 8th to the 12th centuries), and it had at least four monasteries, of which the Saint Zaccheus Monastery remained the most prominent one. The city's Jewish community also survived until at least the 12th century, when the traveller Benjamin of Tudela visited it and attended its synagogue. At least during the Umayyad period, the city was also home to a small Sabian community.

Ibn Ghanm's successor as governor of Raqqa and the Jazira, Sa'id ibn Amir ibn Hidhyam, built the city's first mosque. The building was later enlarged to monumental proportions, measuring some 73 by 108 metres (240 by 354 feet), with a square brick minaret added later, possibly in the mid-10th century. The mosque survived until the early 20th century, being described by the German archaeologist Ernst Herzfeld in 1907, but has since vanished. Many companions of Muhammad lived in Raqqa.

In 656, during the First Fitna, the Battle of Siffin, the decisive clash between Ali and the Umayyad Mu'awiya took place about 45 kilometres (28 mi) west of Raqqa. The tombs of several of Ali's followers (such as Ammar ibn Yasir and Uwais al-Qarani) are in Raqqa and have become sites of pilgrimage. The city also contained a column with Ali's autograph, but it was removed in the 12th century and taken to Aleppo's Ghawth Mosque.

The Islamic conquest of the region did not disrupt the existing trade routes too much, and new Byzantine coins continued to make their way into Raqqa until about 655–8. The Byzantine government may have seen the area as just temporarily in rebellion. Byzantine coinage probably continued to circulate until at least the 690s, if not even longer.

Raqqa appears to have remained an important regional center under Umayyad rule. The Umayyads invested in agriculture in the region, expanding the amount of irrigated farmland and setting the stage for an "economic blossoming" during and after their rule.

The strategic importance of Raqqa grew during the wars at the end of the Umayyad Caliphate and the beginning of the Abbasid Caliphate. Raqqa lay on the crossroads between Syria and Iraq and the road between Damascus, Palmyra and the temporary seat of the caliphate Resafa, al-Ruha'.

=== Abbasid period ===
In 770-1 (155 AH), the Abbasid caliph al-Mansur made the decision to build a new garrison city, called al-Rāfiqah ("the companion"), about 200 metres (660 feet) west of Raqqa as part of a general investment in strengthening the empire's fortifications. The most critical part of this project was to secure the northwestern frontier with the Byzantine Empire, and al-Rafiqah was its largest and most important construction. It also happens to be the only one that survives to the present day. Although most of the interior layout of al-Rafiqah has since been built over, and much of its fortifications have also been demolished, about 2,660 metres (8,730 feet) of its massive city walls are still standing, as well as its congregational mosque – the first in the world to be built from scratch on "a coherent, integrated plan" and a major influence on later mosque architecture.

Although al-Mansur had conceived the vision for al-Rafiqah in 770–1, it wasn't until the next year that construction actually started. The caliph sent his son and eventual successor al-Mahdi to personally supervise the construction of the new city that year. The chronicle of Pseudo-Dionysius indicates that workmen were brought from all over Mesopotamia to work on the construction, hinting at the monumental scale of this project. According to al-Tabari, the plan of al-Rafiqah was basically the same as that of Baghdad: it was built with "the same gates, intervallum (fuṣūl), squares, and streets" as the recently built Abbasid capital. In practice, there were some significant differences between the two: al-Rafiqah was somewhat smaller but more heavily fortified than Baghdad, and its shape was more elongated along a north–south axis instead of the famously round city of Baghdad. Construction continued at al-Rafiqah at least until 774–5, when al-Mahdi was again sent to check on its progress.

At least at the beginning of the construction work on al-Rafiqah, the indigenous residents of Raqqa were hostile to the military settlement – they expected a rise in their own cost of living. The newcomers were soldiers from Khorasan, in contrast to the Christians and Arabs who lived in the old city.

By 785, the old market of Raqqa had probably become physically too small to serve the needs of both it and al-Rafiqah. That year, Ali ibn Sulayman, the city's governor, moved the market from the old city of Raqqa to the agricultural land between the two cities. This probably marks the start of al-Muhtariqa, the industrial and commercial suburb located between the two (see below). (The old market, associated with the Umayyad caliph Hisham, had been just north of the old city, outside the Bāb al-Ruhā' – near the later industrial site of Tall Aswad.)

Raqqa and al-Rāfiqah merged into one urban complex, together larger than the former Umayyad capital, Damascus. In 796, the caliph Harun al-Rashid chose Raqqa/al-Rafiqah as his imperial residence. For about 13 years, Raqqa was the capital of the Abbasid Caliphate, which stretched from Northern Africa to Central Asia, but the main administrative body remained in Baghdad. The palace area of Raqqa covered an area of about 10 square kilometres (3.9 sq mi) north of the twin cities. One of the founding fathers of the Hanafi school of law, Muḥammad ash-Shaibānī, was chief qadi (judge) in Raqqa. The splendour of the court in Raqqa is documented in several poems, collected by Abu al-Faraj al-Isfahāni in his "Book of Songs" (Kitāb al-Aghāni). Only the small, restored so-called Eastern Palace at the fringes of the palace district gives an impression of Abbasid architecture. Some of the palace complexes dating to the period have been excavated by a German team on behalf of the director general of antiquities. There was also a thriving industrial complex located between the twin cities. Both German and English teams have excavated parts of the industrial complex, revealing comprehensive evidence for pottery and glass production. Apart from large dumps of debris, the evidence consisted of pottery and glass workshops, containing the remains of pottery kilns and glass furnaces.

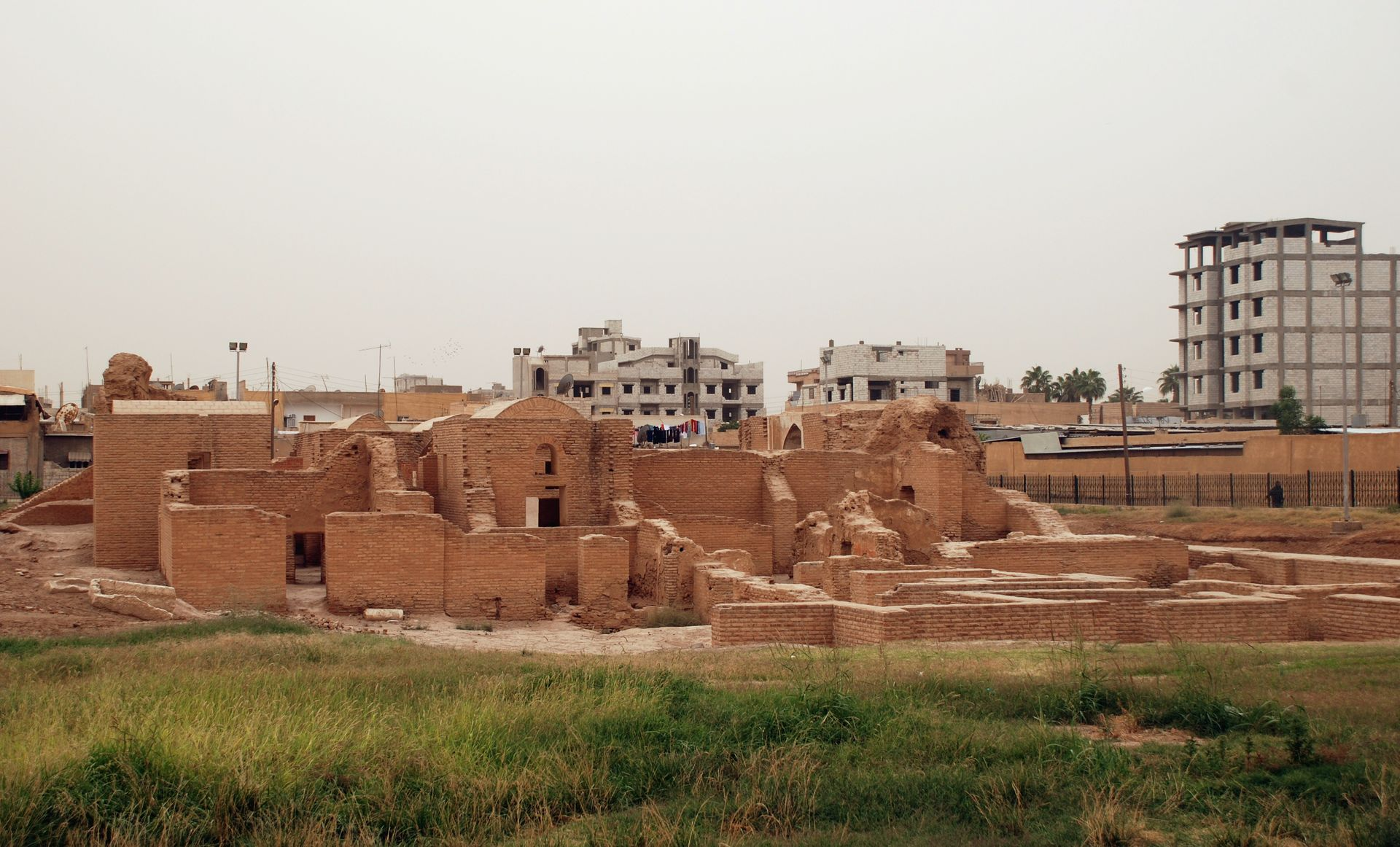
Qasr Al-Banat

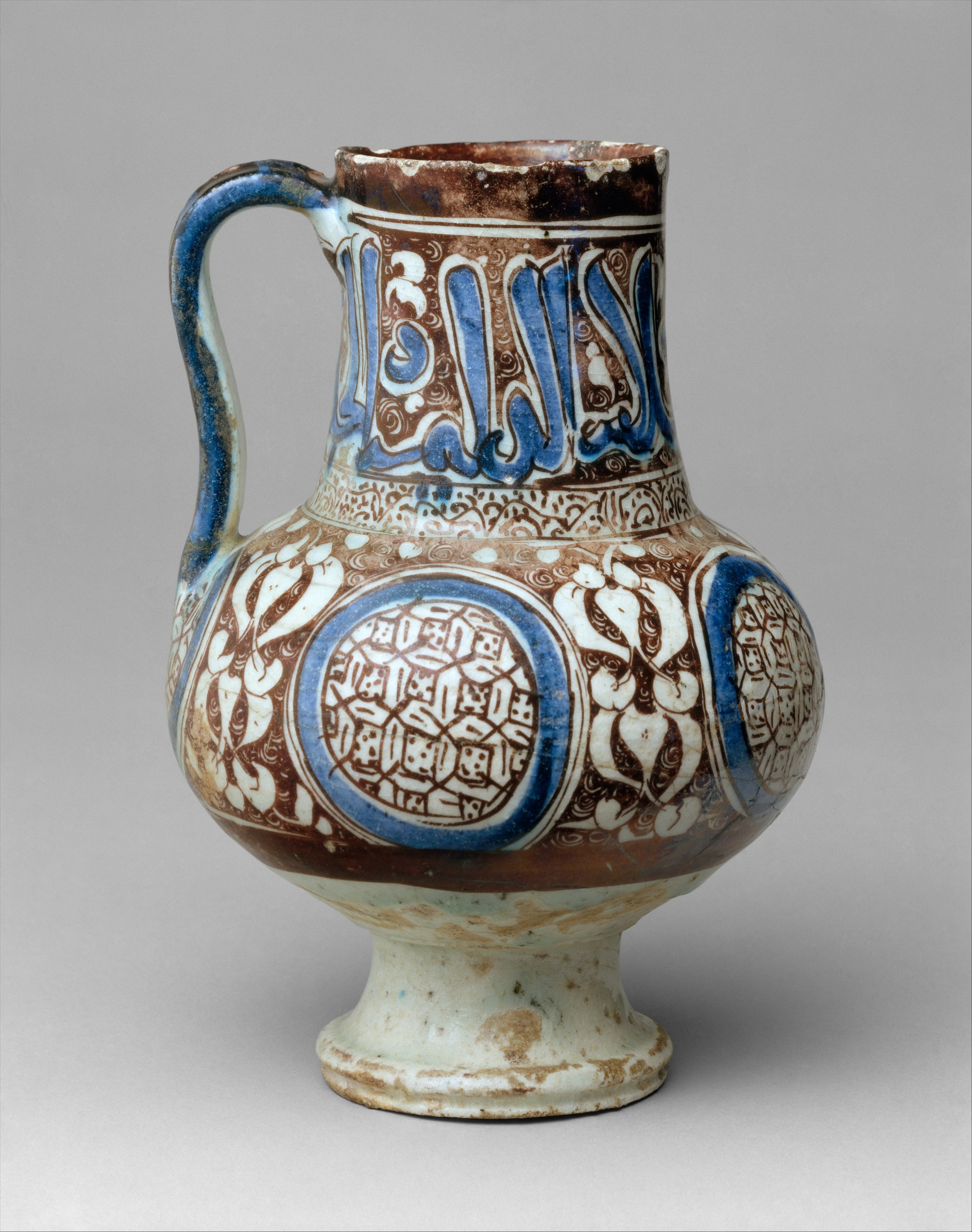
Ewer, late 12th–first half of the 13th century, from Raqqa. Metropolitan Museum of Art.

Approximately 8 kilometres (5.0 mi) west of Raqqa lay the unfinished victory monument Heraqla from the time of Harun al-Rashid. It is said to commemorate the conquest of the Byzantine city of Herakleia in Asia Minor in 806. Other theories connect it with cosmological events. The monument is preserved in a substructure of a square building in the centre of a circular walled enclosure, 500 metres (1,600 ft) in diameter. However, the upper part was never finished because of the sudden death of Harun al-Rashid in Greater Khorasan.

Harun al-Rashid also invested in the water supply in Raqqa. Under his rule, canals were dug along the Euphrates and Balikh rivers; they brought water from the area around Saruj to be used for domestic and agricultural purposes, as well as to supply the palace gardens with water. Meanwhile, the influx of residents generated plenty of demand for food, goods, and services, stimulating the economy and resulting in intensified activity in Raqqa's rural hinterland. Rural towns such as Hisn Maslama, Tall Mahra, and al-Jarud flourished and reached their peak size. The surrounding countryside at this time was "one of the richest agricultural areas of the empire, with an extensive system of irrigation canals".

After the return of the court to Baghdad in 809, Raqqa remained the capital of the western part of the Abbasid Caliphate.

==== Geography of Abbasid Raqqa ====
The name "Raqqa" was used both for the entire urban sprawl, or more specifically for the old city of Raqqa aka Kallinikos. The old city was also known by the name al-Raqqah al-Bayḍā'. It had "almost rectangular" walls, although their entire extent is not known. Where the gates were located is also unknown. This area had a predominantly indigenous population.

===== Al-Rafiqah =====
Somewhat to the west of Raqqa proper was al-Rāfiqah, which had horseshoe-shaped walls. Al-Rafiqah represents the location of present-day Raqqa; at some point the main center shifted here. The earliest evidence for this shift is a Fatimid dinar minted at Raqqa in 1010–1011, which uses the name Raqqa rather than the official Abbasid name of al-Rafiqah. The writer Ibn al-Sam'ani also recorded this shift over a century later. During Raqqa's rapid growth in the late 20th century, al-Rafiqah was almost completely built over with new construction, and today almost nothing remains of the Abbasid city.

Still, about 2,660 metres (8,730 feet) of the original 4,580-metre (15,030-foot) city walls remain today, indicating the massive scale of al-Rafiqah's fortifications. The 6.20-metre-thick walls themselves consisted of mud brick on a stone foundation, and their exterior was further reinforced by a stabilized burnt-brick cladding. The walls had 132 towers. Like the Abbasid capital of Baghdad, al-Rafiqah was protected by a series of outer defenses, which together made up a triple line of defense that any attackers would have to get through. A second, outer wall, itself 4.5 m thick, was built beyond the first wall (at a distance of 20.8 m). Beyond that, there was a 15.9-metre--wide moat. Both the outer wall and the moat were bulldozed in the 1970s or 80s to make room for new construction.

Although al-Rafiqah covered a much smaller area than the round city of Baghdad (less than half), it was much more heavily fortified because of its location close to the Byzantine frontier. The walls of al-Rafiqah were built a meter thicker than Baghdad's, and it had more (and larger) defensive towers.

The north gate of al-Rafiqah, excavated and partly rebuilt in the 1990s, is the earliest surviving city gate from the Abbasid period. Its name was probably the Bāb Ḥarrān, or the Harran Gate. Its basic layout is "a tower gate with a rectangular room and a deep entrance niche". The structure is 18 metres (59 feet) tall, with a ramp on the west side leading up to the top. The gateway was built from stone up to a height of about 2m (above that it was built from brick), while the door opening itself measures 4m. Archaeologists found two door posts made out of solid iron still standing in place here. These probably represent the last traces of a pair of massive iron doors, like the ones that historical texts often mention as part of the entryways to early Islamic cities and palaces. For Raqqa in particular, although not necessarily the Bab Harran itself, different traditions mention an iron gate that originally was part of the Byzantine city of Amorion before being carried off to Samarra in 838 after the Abbasids captured and destroyed the city. This door was then installed at the Bāb al-'Āmma, the main entrance to the caliph al-Mu'tasim's newly built palace. This door then supposedly found its way to Raqqa sometime later during the 9th century, before then being removed in 964 by Sayf al-Dawla, the Hamdanid ruler of Aleppo, to renovate the Bāb Qinnasrīn in his capital. It was then destroyed when the Mongols captured Aleppo in 1260, and its fragments were then taken by the Mamluk sultan Baibars to the citadels of Damascus and Cairo.

Al-Rafiqah itself was laid out on a north–south axis, roughly aligned with the qibla. A major north–south street connected the Bab Harran in the north with al-Rafiqah's Great Mosque, right at the center of the walled city. The mosque measures 108×93 m, about the same size as the Abbasid mosque built at Baghdad a decade earlier. However, its materials are more sophisticated: whereas the Baghdad mosque was originally made from mud bricks with wooden columns and ceiling, the al-Rafiqah mosque is entirely made out of kiln-fired bricks. The roof of al-Rafiqah's mosque was also gabled, in contrast with the flat-roofed Baghdad mosque, showing an influence from earlier Umayyad mosque architecture in Syria, such as the Great Mosque of Damascus. The al-Rafiqah mosque was renovated in 1165–6 by Nur ad-Din Mahmud Zengi, but an archaeological sounding revealed that this renovation did not change the basic structure, so its origins can be firmly dated to the Abbasid period.

The al-Rafiqah mosque represents an important step in the history of mosque architecture. Earlier mosques had mostly been repurposed from earlier pre-Muslim structures, like the Great Mosque of Damascus, or featured a very rudimentary design, such as the original mosque at Baghdad. The al-Rafiqah mosque was the first to be built entirely from scratch on a coherent plan. It had an important influence on later mosque architecture, beginning in 808 when Harun al-Rashid – who was living in Raqqa at the time and would have been familiar with the al-Rafiqah mosque – had the original mosque at Baghdad rebuilt, adopting features of the design at al-Rafiqah. Later mosques such as the Great Mosque of Samarra and the Mosque of Ibn Tulun in Cairo also contain traces of its influence.

===== Al-Muhtariqa =====
Between Raqqa and al-Rafiqah was a large commercial and industrial area, which was called "al-Raqqa al-Muḥtariqa", or "the burning Raqqa", probably because of all the thick smoke coming from pottery kilns and glass furnaces. This smoke may have affected Raqqa/Kallinikos and influenced its decline. It appears that al-Muqaddasi viewed this district as its own distinct city (i.e. madina or misr), which according to legal norms at the time meant that it had to have a separate congregational mosque, and it had to be separated from other urban precincts by some sort of clearly defined boundary. The congregational mosque may have been the "mosque suspended on columns", or perhaps the Samarran complex near the Bab al-Sibal.

Eventually a wall was built on the north side of al-Muhtariqa, probably to protect the central commercial district from Bedouin raids. This is probably the wall that Tahir ibn al-Husayn built while he was governor, in the year following 1 October 815 according to the accounts of Michael the Syrian and Bar Hebraeus. The wall, as visible in old aerial photographs, did not cover the industrial sites north of Raqqa/Kallinikos, leaving them unprotected. Stefan Heidemann suggested that this may have been because those areas were exclusively used for industry, with no houses and no valuables to loot.

Five main streets have been identified in al-Muhtariqa. The northernmost runs eastward from the east gate of al-Rafiqah, called the Bāb al-Sibāl, past the still-unlocated northwestern corner of Raqqa/Kallinikos, and then along the north side of Raqqa/Kallinikos before finally ending around Tall Aswad in the northeast. It passes by several mounds of medieval industrial debris in this area exist. These include Tall Fukhkhār, a ceramic producing site; as well as Tall Ballūr, Tall Abī 'Alī, and Tall Zujāj, which were all glass workshops. Henderson and McLoughlin suggested Tall Ballur may have later been a production site again during the late 11th century after 150 years of abandonment, and Tonghini and Henderson suggested the same for Tall Fukhkhar, although Heidemann considered the latter improbable.

At the eastern end of this northern street, and to the northeast of Raqqa/Kallinikos, was Tall Aswad. This was the largest and easternmost center of pottery production, and probably the oldest among the industrial mounds excavated. It is a large mound consisting of ruins of kilns, potsherds, wasters, and industrial debris. The site had many kilns producing pottery of various types including unglazed, moulded, and high-quality glazed. It lay at the eastern end of the northernmost main road. Its location was probably chosen because it was downwind from the rest of the city, so that the wind wouldn't blow smoke from its kilns over residents' houses. However, this site was also vulnerable and exposed to nomadic attacks, which may have ultimately been the reason for its abandonment. The latest coin find from here is from 825/6, and Tall Aswad probably declined in the first half of the 9th century.

At the western end of the street, right outside the Bab al-Sibal, there was a 200x200m square compound which was probably built during the Samarran period. It featured two rows of small rooms on different levels that were probably rows of shops. There was also some construction to the north of this complex.

The 2nd street runs southeast from the Bab al-Sibal towards the also-still-unlocated western gate of Raqqa/Kallinikos. Like the 1st street, it appears to cut deep into the flat-topped tell formed by centuries of debris. Further south was the southwestern gate of Raqqa/Kallinikos, which was called the Bāb al-Hajarayn. This gate led to a cemetery where people who died in the Battle of Siffin were interred. The most important of the tombs here was that of Uways al-Qarani, considered the "patron saint" of Raqqa; his tomb survived until the late 20th century when it was torn down and replaced with the new Uways al-Qarani mosque. His name also became applied to the entire cemetery.

West of the Bab al-Hajarayn was the mosque called the Masjid al-Janā'iz, also called the Mashhad al-Janā'iz. This building is still unlocated. Its existence is known from the 10th until the 13th centuries. According to al-Qushayri, the Masjid al-Jana'iz was founded by a descendant of Muhammad named Abu Abdallah, a Khorasani who lived by the Bab al-Hajarayn near the city's moat.

The 3rd street starts further south, from the unnamed Gate #2 on the east side of al-Rafiqah. It crosses the 2nd street and probably converged with the 1st street at the northwestern corner of Raqqa/Kallinikos, where there was likely a gate.

The 4th and 5th streets both have their west end at the Bab Baghdad. Together, they mark the southern end of the al-Muhtariqa area. Since the Bab Baghdad is a comparatively newer structure, probably from the late 11th or 12th century, these two streets might have also been built later. The 4th street runs northeast toward the northwest corner of Raqqa/Kallinikos, where it probably converged with the 1st and 3rd streets. As for the 5th street, it goes southeast, cutting through the Siffin cemetery and passing by the southwest corner of Raqqa/Kallinikos.

The settlement of al-Muhtariqa probably began in 785, when the city's governor Ali ibn Sulayman transferred Raqqa's market from Raqqa/Kallinikos to somewhere between it and al-Rafiqah. Before then, this area had been used for agriculture. Later, al-Muhtariqa was expanded when Harun al-Rashid made Raqqa his capital, in order to serve the newly increased demand for luxury and everyday goods.

When al-Muhtariqa finally declined and became abandoned is not clear. Physical evidence includes coins, as late as 825–6 at Tall Aswad and 840–1 at Tall Zujaj, and pottery remains, which at both sites include fragments of the so-called "Samarra ware" in the upper layers, so activity at those sites must have continued at least until that period. Based on the account of Ahmad ibn al-Tayyib al-Sarakhsi in the 880s (see below), al-Muhtariqa was probably still active at least until that point.

===== The palace city =====
When Harun al-Rashid made Raqqa his capital, he built a whole "palace city" to the north of the main city. During the 12 years he resided here, it was built up to an area of 15 square kilometers. Like al-Rafiqah, this area has been almost completely obliterated by new housing construction since the late 20th century. Besides palaces and other buildings, this area included irrigation canals and underground watercourses in order to ensure a constant water supply. Many of the palaces were set in large garden enclosures, with wide avenues and racecourses. Toward the end of Harun al-Rashid's reign, this area was also expanded further to the north.

The central palace of Harun al-Rashid is located about 1 km northeast of al-Rafiqah. Here, a large 340x270m building set in a double garden enclosure probably represents the remains of the Qaṣr as-Salām, or "palace of peace", mentioned in historical sources. This building's original floorplan has been obscured by later construction, but some of its ornate decoration survived to indicate its importance.

East of the Qasr as-Salam is a series of three smaller palaces, each one featuring courtyards, triple audience halls, and small private mosques. These were probably the residences of Harun al-Rashid's family members or close associates. A fresco inscription found in the westernmost of these three palaces names the caliph al-Mu'tasim, who was one of Harun al-Rashid's sons; this may date from a later renovation.

Just south of the palace with al-Mu'tasim's name inscribed is a 150x150m square building that was probably the barracks for the palace guard. It had several identical rooms to serve as living quarters, while the commander of the guards had a central room flanked by three connected courtyards. Excavation at the barracks unearthed "a group of particularly luxurious glass vessels", indicating the high living standards enjoyed even by the lower-ranking members of the caliphal court.

Farther south, at the southeastern corner of the palace complex, was a public square surrounded by several buildings. Some of these buildings were reception halls used for social gatherings. Other buildings were private residences, probably belonging to people who were not part of the caliph's inner circle. On the west side of the square was a building that included a small mosque facing the barracks.

Separate from this palace city and just outside the north gate of al-Rafiqah, there was a 160x130m rectangular building that also had a double enclosure. This may have actually been built earlier than the more monumental complexes further northeast.

Stylistically, like the mosque of al-Rafiqah, the palace complex contains decorative features typical of pre-Islamic Syria. These include stucco friezes depicting vine "scrolls", as well as the "use of decoration to emphasize key architectural features". This indicates that the builders were taking inspiration from previous local styles. The resulting style of Abbasid Raqqa is a transition between pre-Islamic styles and later Abbasid ones, such as the architecture of Samarra after it became the new Abbasid capital in 836.

===== Monasteries =====
Further north of Tall Aswad was the Dayr al-Zakkā monastery, which was built on top of the ancient settlement mound now called Tall al-Bī'a. This was the most important monastery in the city and the symbol of Christian Raqqa.

A second important monastery was the so-called Monastery of the Columns (dērā d-esṭūnā), also called the Bizūnā monastery. It was somewhere between Raqqa and al-Rafiqah, in the area of al-Muhtariqa. It was burned by the rebels Umar, a former prisoner in Raqqa, and Nasr ibn Shabath, a prominent Bedouin leader, during a violent conflict in 811/2 when Arab auxiliaries were mobilized at Raqqa. However, just a few years later in 818 it was the site of the installation of Patriarch Dionysios I, which indicates that either the monastery was only partly burned down, or that it had already been rebuilt. This monastery was probably replaced later on by the "mosque suspended on columns", as al-Muqaddasi called it. This may have been the congregational mosque of al-Muhtariqa.

===== Port =====
Abbasid Raqqa had an important river port, which played a vital role in trade and communications. Raqqa's location was ideal for a river port on the upper Euphrates – it was ice-free throughout the year, whereas the early 14th century author al-Dimashqi wrote that the Euphrates sometimes froze further north. Archaeologists have not found evidence of this port, but it may have been south of al-Muhtariqa on the bank of the Euphrates because this would have been a convenient location close to the city's main commercial center. Based on Ibn Sa'd's account of the famous hadith scholar al-Waqidi's visit to Raqqa under Harun al-Rashid, it seems that the port of Raqqa was separated from the city proper by a checkpoint and a "poor, simple guesthouse" (khān nuzūl). Most of the boats used on this part of the Euphrates were probably light carriers called harraqs.

==== Economy of Abbasid Raqqa ====
Abbasid Raqqa was an important center of glass and ceramics production. Al-Muqaddasi also mentioned a soapmaking industry at Raqqa, which is connected to the glass industry because both make use of alkali. Minerals used as colorants in glassmaking or glazing pottery may have come from Jabal Bishr to the south, since Yaqut al-Hamawi recorded glassmakers in Aleppo using minerals from Jabal Bishr as a colorant in the early 1200s.

According to Julian Henderson, Raqqa is one of the earliest places where an important shift in glassmaking technology occurred at the turn of the 9th century (i.e. around 800). Before, glassmakers had been using mineral alkali as a flux or purifying agent in the glassmaking process. Around 800, though, Raqqawi glassmakers switched to using plant ashes, which were readily available and much cheaper to obtain. On top of that, the plant ashes contained potassium, which lowered the melting temperature for the glass furnaces, reducing production costs even further. Henderson connects this technological change with the famous alchemist Jabir ibn Hayyan, who is known to have had an interest in glassmaking at around the same time, indicating that he may have been a resident of Raqqa during this period.

The port of Raqqa was probably the main entrepôt (shipment point) where food and goods from northern Syria and Mesopotamia were shipped to before then being exported to Baghdad and the rest of Iraq. For example, Ibn al-Adim noted that olive oil from northern Syria was traded in Raqqa and then shipped downstream to Iraq and the Gulf. One passage written by al-Tanukhi recorded a merchant from Baghdad named al-Marwazi (d. 909 or 910) who speculated in olive oil prices at Raqqa.

Raqqa also had a mint for coins and was the only important mint city in the region from the time of Harun al-Rashid onward. The last dated copper coin from Abbasid Raqqa was struck in 892 (copper coins in general had fallen out of widespread use in the region during the late 9th century), but it continued minting gold and silver coins uninterrupted until at least 934–5. No coins from anywhere in the region have been found for the rest of the 10th century, but some sporadic, debased coins from 11th-century Raqqa have been found.

=== Decline and period of Bedouin domination ===
Raqqa's fortunes declined in the late 9th century because of continuous warfare between the Abbasids and the Tulunids, and then with the Shia movement of the Qarmatians. Under the Hamdānids in the 940s, the city declined rapidly. From the late 10th century to the early 12th century, Raqqa was controlled by Bedouin dynasties. The Banu Numayr had their pasture in the Diyār Muḍar, and the Banu Uqayl had their centre in Qal'at Ja'bar.

One of the earliest sources to comment on Raqqa's decline is Ahmad ibn al-Tayyib al-Sarakhsi (d. 899), as quoted by Yaqut; he visited Raqqa in 884-5 and wrote that parts of its walls were in ruins at the time. However, the markets and presumably the industrial areas of al-Muhtariqa were still in use then.

Raqqa was conquered by the Hamdanids in 942. As a result, it lost its status as an Abbasid garrison city. This had a severe economic impact on Raqqa and the surrounding region: without the soldiers and their disposable income, the demand for food and goods decreased, and local artisans were deprived of potential customers. In the second half of the 10th century, Raqqa appears to have been eclipsed by Harran as the main city in the region based on mint activity and literary references.

With one notable exception, the Numayrid rulers were essentially Bedouin nomads by lifestyle. They had no interest in cities except as sources of income to be exploited. They resided at nomadic camps (called a ḥillah, like the city in Iraq) in the pasture outside the cities and delegated administration of the cities to ghulam (military slave) governors. During this period of Bedouin rule, the area of settled agriculture shrank while the area allocated to Bedouin pastures grew, and trade routes linking various cities, towns, and villages were threatened by Bedouin raids.

After the death of the Numayrid amir Shabib ibn Waththab in 1039–40, Raqqa and its surrounding fertile pastures became the center of a conflict between the Numayrids and the Mirdasids of Aleppo. Shabib's sister as-Sayyidah al-'Alawiyyah was given Raqqa as an inheritance; through her marriage to the Mirdasid amir Thimal ibn Salih, the city and its territory came under Mirdasid control She ousted the ghulam governor of Raqqa appointed by her brothers al-Muta'in and al-Qawam, who now shared power as Numayrid amirs. However, Shabib's young son Mani' viewed himself as the legitimate heir to his father's lands, including Raqqa. By 1056, he had become an adult and gained power as sole Numayrid amir. He sent a demand to Thimal requesting that Raqqa be handed over to him; Thimal refused, and in April 1056 war broke out between the two sides.

Ultimately, though, it was diplomacy that ended up bringing Raqqa back under Mani's control. While this was all happening, conflict was brewing between the Fatimid Caliphate (which Thimal was aligned with) and the Seljuk Empire (which Mani' was aligned with). The Turkic general Arslan al-Basasiri, who supported the Fatimids, had been driven out of Baghdad in December 1055 by the Seljuks and was now continuing anti-Seljuk operations from his new base at al-Rahba nearby. In October 1057, al-Basasiri went north up the Euphrates towards Balis and on the way captured Raqqa from Thimal's forces. At the same time, the Fatimid envoy al-Mu'ayyad fi'l-Din al-Shirazi met with Mani' to secure his support for the Fatimids. In return, al-Basasiri handed over control of Raqqa to Mani'.

Now under Fatimid protection, the Numayrids reached the height of their power. Substantial amounts of Fatimid money were probably transferred into Mani's coffers at this point, which allowed him to undertake major construction projects in his cities and thus present himself as the only urban ruler from the Numayrid dynasty (although the Numayrids in general remained nomadic pastoralists). The biggest projects were in his capital of Harran, but he probably also started some in Raqqa as well. He certainly had a mint active in Raqqa at this point — archaeologists found coins struck in his name in Raqqa, dated to 1058, buried under a collapsed wall in the city's congregational mosque. Remains of a workshop under the same wall may also indicate that restoration work was started on the mosque around the same time. However, it appears that this work was stopped soon after it started. A possible reason is Mani's sudden death in 1062, which left the Numayrids without an effective ruler and dealt a huge blow to their overall political power.

=== Second blossoming ===
Raqqa experienced a second blossoming, based on agriculture and industrial production, during the Zangid and Ayyubid dynasties during the 12th and the first half of the 13th century. The blue-glazed Raqqa ware dates from this time. The still-visible Bāb Baghdād (Baghdad Gate) and the Qasr al-Banāt (Castle of the Ladies) are notable buildings of the period. The famous ruler 'Imād ad-Dīn Zangī, who was killed in 1146, was initially buried in Raqqa, which was destroyed during the 1260s Mongol invasions of the Levant. There is a report on the killing of the last inhabitants of the ruins of the city in 1288.

=== Ottoman period ===
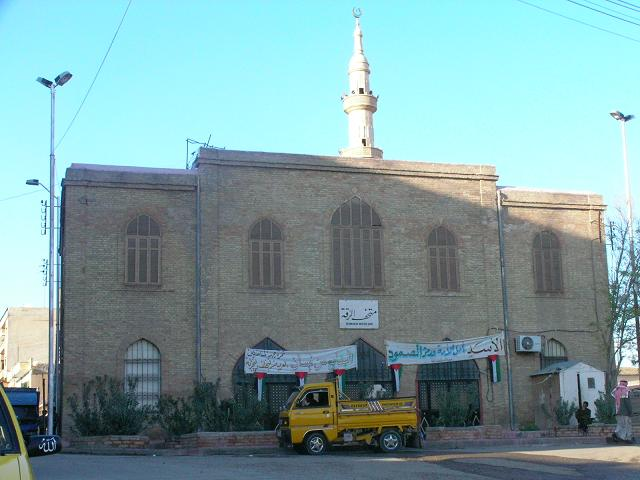
Raqqa Museum (pre-Syrian Civil War)

In the 16th century, Raqqa again entered the historical record as an Ottoman customs post on the Euphrates. The eyalet (province) of Raqqa was created in 1586. However, the capital of the eyalet and seat of the Wāli was not Raqqa but Al-Ruha', which is about 160 kilometres (99 mi) north of Raqqa. In the 17th century the famous Ottoman traveler and author Evliya Çelebi only noticed Arab and Turkoman nomad tents in the vicinity of the ruins. The citadel was partially restored in 1683 and again housed a Janissary detachment; over the next decades the province of al-Raqqah became the centre of the Ottoman Empire's tribal settlement (iskân) policy. Between 1800 and 1803, the province was governed by the famous Milli Timur Paşa of the Kurdish Milli tribe.

From the 1820s, Raqqa was a place of wintering for the semi-nomadic Arab 'Afadla tribal confederation and was little more than its extensive archeological remains. It was the establishment in 1864 by the Ottomans of the Karakul Janissary garrison, in the south-east corner of the Abbasid enclosure, that led to the revival of the modern city of Raqqa.

The first families that settled in Raqqa were nicknamed ''The Ghul'' by the surrounding Arab semi-nomadic tribes from whom they bought the right to settle within the Abbasid enclosure, near the Janissary garrison. They used the ancient bricks of the enclosure to build the first buildings of modern Raqqa. They came under the protection of the surrounding Arab semi-nomadic tribes because they feared attacks from other neighboring tribes on their herds. As a result, these families formed two alliances. One joined Kurds of the Mîlan tribe, Arabs of the Dulaim tribe, and possibly Turkomans as well. Most of the Kurdish families came from an area called ''Nahid Al-Jilab'', which is 20 kilometres (12 miles) northeast of Şanliurfa. Prior to the Syrian Civil War, there were many families in Raqqa that still belonged to the Mîlan tribe such as Khalaf Al-Qasim, Al-Jado, Al-Hani and Al-Shawakh. They claimed the area west of the Ottoman garrison.

The Mîlan tribe had been in Raqqa since 1711. The Ottomans issued an order to deport them from the Nahid Al-Jilab region to the Raqqa area. However most of the tribe was returned to their original home as a result of diseases among their cattle and frequent deaths due to the Raqqa climate. In the mid-18th century, the Ottomans recognised the Kurdish tribal chiefs and appointed Mahmud Kalash Abdi as head of the iskân policy in the region. The tribal chiefs had the power to impose taxes and control over other tribes in the region.

Some of the Kurdish families were displaced to the northern countryside of Raqqa by the Arab 'Annazah tribe, after they began working with the French Mandate for Syria and the Lebanon.

The other alliance, Asharin, came from the town of Al-Asharah downstream. It included several Arab tribes of the Al-Bu Badran and Mawali tribes. They claimed the area east of the Ottoman garrison.

The Raqqa Museum is housed in a building that was built in 1861 and served as an Ottoman governmental building.

=== 20th century ===
In the early 20th century, two waves of Cherkess refugees from the Caucasian War were granted lands west of the Abbasid enclosure by the Ottomans.

In 1915, Armenians fleeing the Armenian genocide were given safe haven in Raqqa by the Arab Ujayli family. Many moved to Aleppo in the 1920s. Armenians have since then formed the majority of Raqqa's Christian community.

In the 1950s, the worldwide cotton boom stimulated unprecedented growth in the city and the recultivation of this part of the middle Euphrates area. Cotton is still the main agricultural product of the region.

The growth of the city led to the destruction or removal of much of the archaeological remains of the city's past. The palace area is now almost covered with settlements, as is the former area of the ancient al-Raqqa (today Mishlab) and the former Abbasid industrial district (today al-Mukhtalţa). Only parts were archaeologically explored. The 12th-century citadel was removed in the 1950s (today Dawwār as-Sā'a, the clock-tower circle). In the 1980s, rescue excavations in the palace area began, as well as the conservation of the Abbasid city walls with the Bāb Baghdād and the two main monuments intra muros, the Abbasid mosque and the Qasr al-Banāt.

=== 21st century ===
==== Syrian civil war outbreak ====
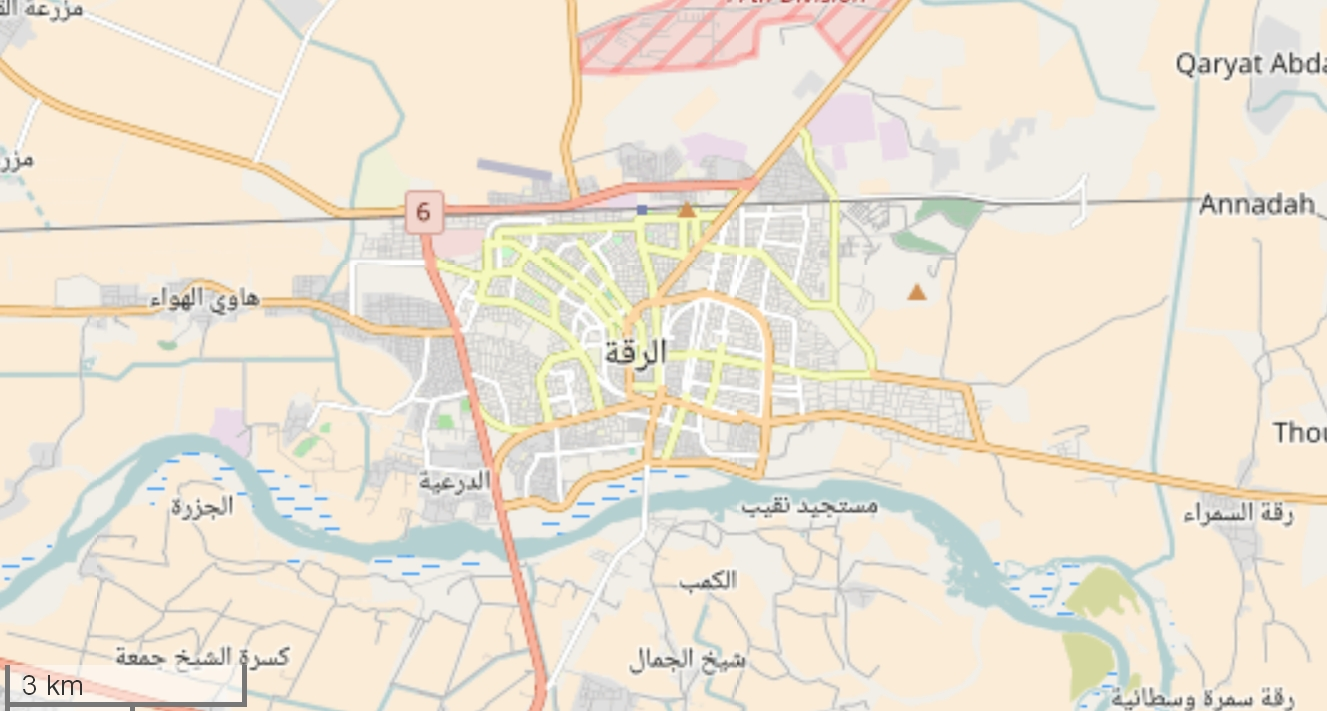
Raqqa city map

In March 2013, during the Syrian civil war, rebels from the Free Syrian Army, Ahrar al-Sham, Al-Nusra Front, and other groups overran the government loyalists in the city during the Battle of Raqqa (2013) and declared it under their control, after they had taken the central square and pulled down the statue of the former president of Syria, Hafez al-Assad. Raqqa was the first provincial capital to fall to the Syrian opposition.

The Al-Qaeda-affiliated Al-Nusra Front set up a sharia court at the sports centre and in early June 2013, the Islamic State of Iraq and the Levant said that it was open to receive complaints at its Raqqa headquarters.

Migration from Aleppo, Homs, Idlib and other inhabited places to the city occurred as a result of the ongoing civil war in the country, and Raqqa was known as the hotel of the revolution by some because of the number of people who moved there.

==== Capital of the Islamic State (2014–2017) ====
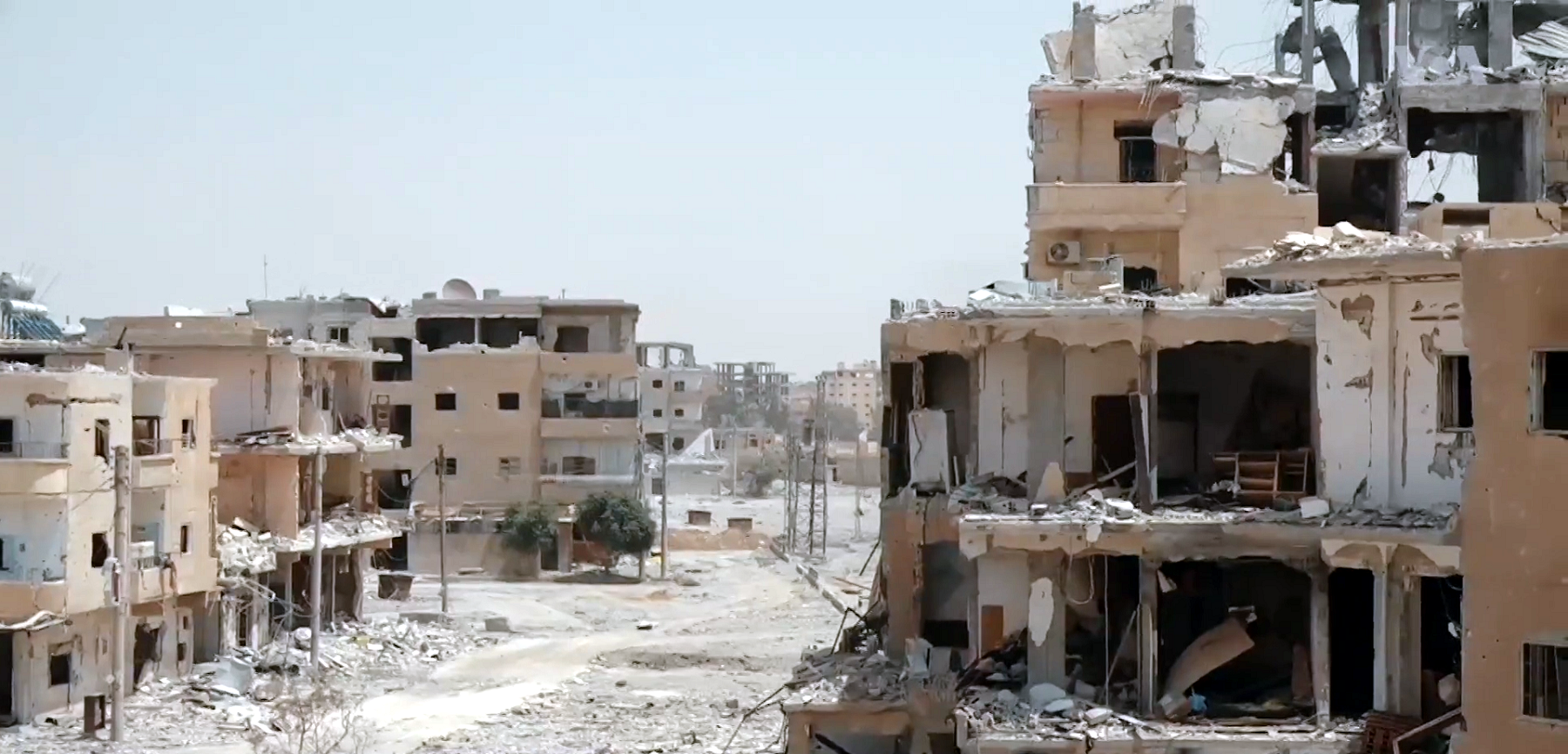
Destroyed neighborhood in Raqqa, August 2017

ISIL took complete control of Raqqa by 13 January 2014. ISIL proceeded to execute Alawites and suspected supporters of Bashar al-Assad in the city and destroyed the city's Shia mosques and Christian churches such as the Armenian Catholic Church of the Martyrs, which was then converted into an ISIL police headquarters and an Islamic centre, tasked to recruit new fighters. The Christian population of Raqqa, which had been estimated to be as much as 10% of the total population before the civil war began, largely fled the city.

On 15 November 2015, France, in response to attacks in Paris two days earlier, dropped about 20 bombs on multiple Islamic State targets in Raqqa.

Pro-government sources said that an anti-IS uprising took place between 5 and 7 March 2016.

On 26 October 2016, US Defense Secretary Ash Carter said that an offensive to take Raqqa from IS would begin within weeks.

==== DAANES control (2017–2026) ====
The Syrian Democratic Forces (SDF), supported by the US, launched the Second Battle of Raqqa on 6 June 2017 and declared victory in the city on 17 October 2017. Bombardment by the US-led coalition led to the destruction of most of the city, including civilian infrastructure. Some 270,000 people were said to have fled Raqqa.

At the end of October 2017, the government of Syria issued a statement that said: "Syria considers the claims of the United States and its so-called alliance about the liberation of Raqqa city from ISIS to be lies aiming to divert international public opinion from the crimes committed by this alliance in Raqqa province.... more than 90% of Raqqa city has been leveled due to the deliberate and barbaric bombardment of the city and the towns near it by the alliance, which also destroyed all services and infrastructures and forced tens of thousands of locals to leave the city and become refugees. Syria still considers Raqqa to be an occupied city, and it can only be considered liberated when the Syrian Arab Army enters it".

By June 2019, 300,000 residents had returned to the city, including 90,000 IDPs, and many shops in the city had reopened. Through the efforts of the Global Coalition and the Raqqa Civil Council, several public hospitals and schools have been reopened, public buildings like the stadium, the Raqqa Museum, mosques and parks have been restored, anti-extremism educational centers for youth have been established and the rebuilding and restoration of roads, roundabouts and bridges, installation of solar-powered street lighting, water restoration, demining, re-institution of public transportation and rubble removal has taken place.

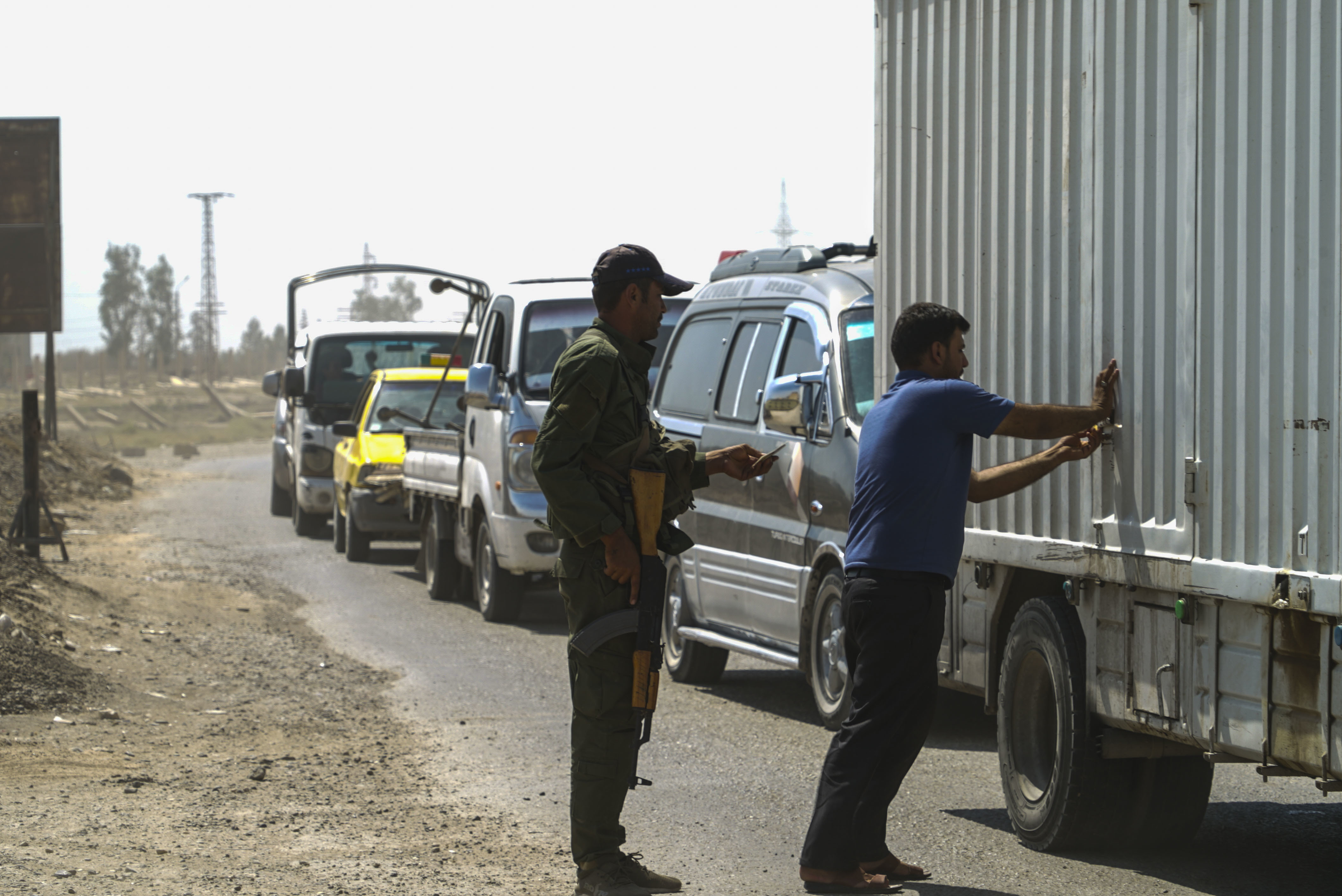
Raqqa Internal Security Forces (RISF) member inspecting vehicles at a checkpoint, 18 August 2018

However, the Global Coalition's funding of the stabilization of the region has been limited, and the Coalition has stated that any large scale aid will be halted until a peace agreement for the future of Syria through the Geneva process has been reached. Rebuilding of residential houses and commercial buildings has been placed solely in the hands of civilians, there is a continued presence of rubble, unreliable electricity and water access in some areas, schools still lacking basic services and the presence of ISIL sleeper cells and IEDs. Some sporadic protests against the SDF have taken place in the city in the summer of 2018.

On 7 February 2019, the SDF media center announced the capture of 63 ISIL operatives in the city. According to the SDF, the operatives were a part of a sleeper cell and were all arrested within a 24-hour time span, ending the day-long curfew that was imposed on the city the day before.

In mid-February 2019, a mass grave holding an estimated 3,500 bodies was discovered below a plot of farmland in the Al-Fukheikha agricultural suburb. It was the largest mass grave discovered post-ISIL rule thus far. The bodies were reported to be the victims of executions when ISIL ruled the city.

In 2019 a project called the "Shelter Project" was launched by international organizations in coordination with the Raqqa Civil Council, providing funding to residents of partially destroyed buildings in order to aid with their reconstruction. In April 2019 the rehabilitation of the Old Raqqa Bridge over the Euphrates was finished. The bridge was originally built by British forces during World War II in 1942. The National Hospital in Raqqa was reopened after rehabilitation work in May 2019.

As a consequence of the 2019 Turkish offensive into north-eastern Syria, the SDF called on the Syrian Arab Army to enter the areas under its rule, including in the area of Raqqa as part of a deal to prevent Turkish troops from capturing any more territory in northern Syria.

==== Syrian transitional government control ====
On 18 January 2026, the Syrian transitional government forces entered Raqqa during the northeastern Syria offensive following the withdrawal of Syrian Democratic Forces after the ceasefire. The DAANES administration encouraged a nonsectarian, secular city government to form.

== Archaeology ==
The Raqqa Museum had numerous clay tablets with cuneiform writing and many other objects vanishing in the fog of war. A particular set of those tablets were excavated by archaeologists from Leiden at the Tell Sabi Abyad. The excavation team cast silicone rubber moulds of the tablets before the war to create cast copies for subsequent studies in the Netherlands. As the original tablets were looted, those moulds became the only evidence of parts of the 12th century BC in Northern Syria. Having a lifespan of roughly thirty years, the moulds proved not be a durable solution, hence the need for digitization to counter the loss of the originals. Therefore, the Scanning for Syria (SfS) project was initiated by the Leiden University and Delft University of Technology under the auspices of the Leiden-Delft-Erasmus Centre for Global Heritage and Development. The project received a NWO–KIEM Creatieve Industrie grant to use of 3D acquisition and 3D printing technology to make high quality reproductions of the clay tablets. In collaboration with the Catholic University of Louvain and the Heidelberg University several imaging technologies were explored to find the best solution to capture the precious texts hidden within the concavities of the moulds. In the end, the X-ray micro-CT scanner housed at the TU Delft laboratory of Geoscience and Engineering turned out to be a good compromise between time-efficiency, accuracy and text recovery. Accurate digital 3D reconstructions of the original clay tablets were created using the CT data of the silicon moulds. Furthermore, the Forensic Computational Geometry Laboratory in Heidelberg dramatically decreased the time for decipherment of a tablet by automatically computing high quality images using the GigaMesh Software Framework. These images clearly show the cuneiform characters in publication quality, which otherwise would have taken many hours to manually craft a matching drawing. The 3D-models and high-quality images have become accessible to both scholar and non-scholar communities worldwide. Physical replicas were produced using 3D-printing. The 3D-prints serve as teaching material in Assyriology classes as well as for visitors of the Rijksmuseum van Oudheden to experience the ingenuity of Assyrian cuneiform writing. In 2020, the SfS received the European Union Prize for Cultural Heritage of the Europa Nostra in the category research.

== Ecclesiastical history ==
In the 6th century, Kallinikos became a center of Assyrian monasticism. Dayra d'Mār Zakkā, or the Saint Zacchaeus monastery, situated on Tall al-Bi'a, became renowned. A mosaic inscription there is dated to the year 509, presumably from the period of the foundation of the monastery. Daira d'Mār Zakkā is mentioned by various sources up to the 10th century. The second important monastery in the area was the Bīzūnā monastery or Dairā d-Esţunā, the 'monastery of the column'. The city became one of the main cities of the historical Diyār Muḍar, the western part of the Jazīra.

Michael the Syrian records twenty Syriac Orthodox (Jacobite) bishops from the 8th to the 12th centuries—and had at least four monasteries, of which the Saint Zaccheus Monastery remained the most prominent. In 818, a Syriac synod convened to discuss the controversy around the use of the phrase "the heavenly phrase" as well as to elect a new patriarch; in the end, Dionysius Tel-Maḥroyō was chosen.

In the 9th century, when Raqqa served as capital of the western half of the Abbasid Caliphate, Dayra d'Mār Zakkā, or the Saint Zacchaeus Monastery, became the seat of the Syriac Orthodox Patriarch of Antioch, one of several rivals for the apostolic succession of the Ancient patriarchal see, which has several more rivals of Catholic and Orthodox churches.

=== Bishopric ===
Callinicum early became the seat of a Christian diocese. In 388, Byzantine Emperor Theodosius the Great was informed that a crowd of Christians, led by their bishop, had destroyed the synagogue. He ordered the synagogue rebuilt at the expense of the bishop. Ambrose wrote to Theodosius, pointing out he was thereby "exposing the bishop to the danger of either acting against the truth or of death", and Theodosius rescinded his decree.

Bishop Damianus of Callinicum took part in the Council of Chalcedon in 451 and in 458 was a signatory of the letter that the bishops of the province wrote to Emperor Leo I the Thracian after the death of Proterius of Alexandria. In 518 Paulus was deposed for having joined the anti-Chalcedonian Severus of Antioch. Callinicum had a Bishop Ioannes in the mid-6th century. In the same century, a Notitia Episcopatuum lists the diocese as a suffragan of Edessa, the capital and metropolitan see of Osrhoene.

=== Titular sees ===
No longer a residential bishopric, Callinicum has been listed by the Catholic Church twice as a titular see, as suffragan of the Metropolitan of the Late Roman province of Osroene : first as Latin - (meanwhile suppressed) and currently as Maronite titular bishopric.

==== Callinicum of the Romans ====
No later than the 18th century, the diocese was nominally restored as Latin Titular bishopric of Callinicum (Latin), adjective Callinicen(sis) (Latin) / Callinico (Curiate Italian).

In 1962 it was suppressed, to establish immediately the Episcopal Titular bishopric of Callinicum of the Maronites (see below)

It has had the following incumbents, all of the fitting episcopal (lowest) rank:

- Matthaeus de Robertis (1729.07.06 – death 1733) (born Italy) no prelature
- Meinwerk Kaup, Benedictine Order (O.S.B.) (1733.09.02 – death 1745.07.24) as Auxiliary Bishop of Paderborn (Germany) (1733.09.02 – 1745.07.24)
- Anton Johann Wenzel Wokaun (1748.09.16 – 1757.02.07) as Auxiliary Bishop of Praha (Prague, Bohemia) (1748.09.16 – 1757.02.07)
- Nicolas de La Pinte de Livry, Norbertines (O. Praem.) (born France) (1757.12.19 – death 1795) no prelature
- Luigi Pietro Grati, Servites (O.S.M.) (born Italy) (1828.12.15 – death 1849.09.17) as Apostolic Administrator of Terracina (Italy) (1829 – 1833), Apostolic Administrator of Priverno (Italy) (1829 – 1833), Apostolic Administrator of Sezze (Italy) (1829 – 1833) and on emeritate
- Godehard Braun (1849.04.02 – death 1861.05.22) as Auxiliary Bishop of Diocese of Trier (Germany) (1849.04.02 – 1861.05.22)
- Hilarion Silani, Sylvestrines (O.S.B. Silv.) (1863.09.22 – 1879.03.27) while Bishop of Colombo (Sri Lanka) (1863.09.17 – 1879.03.27)
- Aniceto Ferrante, Oratorians of Philip Neri (C.O.) (1879.05.12 – death 1883.01.19) on emeritate as former Bishop of Gallipoli (Italy) (1873.03.20 – 1879.05.12)
- Luigi Sepiacci, Augustinians (O.E.S.A.) (1883.03.15 – cardinalate 1891.12.14) as Roman Curia official : President of Pontifical Ecclesiastical Academy (1885.08.07 – 1886.06.28), Secretary of Sacred Congregation of Bishops and Regulars (1886.06.28 – 1892.08.01), created Cardinal-Priest of S. Prisca (1891.12.17 – death 1893.04.26), Prefect of Sacred Congregation of Indulgences and Sacred Relics (1892.08.01 – 1893.04.26)
- Pasquale de Siena (1898.09.23 – death 1920.11.25) as Auxiliary Bishop of Napoli (Napels, southern Italy) (1898.09.23 – 1920.11.25)
- Joseph Gionali (1921.11.21 – 1928.06.13) as Abbot Ordinary of Territorial Abbacy of Shën Llezhri i Oroshit (Albania) (1921.08.28 – 1928.06.13), later Bishop of Sapë (Albania) (1928.06.13 – 1935.10.30), emeritate as Titular Bishop of Rhesaina (1935.10.30 – death 1952.12.20)
- Barnabé Piedrabuena (1928.12.17 – 1942.06.11) as emeritate; previously Titular Bishop of Cestrus (1907.12.16 – 1910.11.08) as Auxiliary Bishop of Tucumán (Argentina) (1907.12.16 – 1910.11.08 - first time), Bishop of Catamarca (Argentina) (1910.11.08 – 1923.06.11), again Bishop of Tucumán (1923.06.11 – retired 1928.12.17)
- Tomás Aspe, Friars Minor (O.F.M.) (born Spain) (1942.11.21 – 1962.01.22) on emeritate as former Bishop of Cochabamba (Bolivia) (1931.06.08 – 1942.11.21)

==== Callinicum of the Maronites ====
In 1962 the simultaneously suppressed Latin Titular see of Callinicum (see above) was in turn restored, now for the Maronite Church (Eastern Catholic, Antiochian Rite) as Titular bishopric of Callinicum (Latin), Callinicen(sis) Maronitarum (Latin adjective) / Callinico (Curiate Italian).

It has had the following incumbents, so far of the fitting Episcopal (lowest) rank :

- Francis Mansour Zayek (1962.05.30 – 1971.11.29) as first Auxiliary Bishop of São Sebastião do Rio de Janeiro (Brazil) (1962.05.30 – 1966.01.27), then Apostolic Exarch of United States of America of the Maronites (USA) (1966.01.27 – 1971.11.29); later promoted with that see as only Eparch (Bishop) of Saint Maron of Detroit of the Maronites (USA) (1971.11.29 – 1977.06.27), restyled as that see moved to first Eparch (Bishop) of Saint Maron of Brooklyn of the Maronites (USA) (1977.06.27 – 1982.12.10), personally promoted Archbishop-Bishop of Saint Maron of Brooklyn of the Maronites (1982.12.10 – retired 1996.11.11); died 2010
- John George Chedid (1980.10.13 – 1994.02.19) as Auxiliary Bishop of Saint Maron of Brooklyn of the Maronites (USA) (1980.10.13 – 1994.02.19); later first Eparch (Bishop) of its daughter see Our Lady of Lebanon of Los Angeles of the Maronites (East Coast of USA) (1994.02.19 – retired 2000.11.20), died 2012
- Samir Mazloum (1996.11.11 – ...), as Bishop of Curia of the Maronites (2000 – retired 2011.08.13) and on emeritate.

== Religion and culture ==
Raqqa has never been home to a sizeable Shi'i community. However, since the Iran–Iraq War made the important Shi'i holy cities of Najaf and Karbala inaccessible to Iranian visitors, Raqqa has gained importance as a Shi'i pilgrimage destination (accessible via Turkey). The main attractions are the tombs of Ammar ibn Yasir and Uways al-Qarani, two companions of Muhammad who died during the Battle of Siffin. Beginning in 1988 and completed in 2005, an Iranian project oversaw the construction of two new mosques to replace the tombs, making them the largest Shi'i mausoleums in Syria. The Uways mosque was blown up by the Islamic State in May 2014 for being a "pagan Iranian shrine".

Uways al-Qarani is an important religious figure in Raqqa, and could be called the city's "patron saint". East of the main city, between the Bab Baghdad and the Siffin cemetery, a large mulberry tree has been dedicated to him for a long time. It is considered a holy site placed under Uways's protection. At least until the 1940s, semi-nomadic families would leave their personal belongings at the foot of the tree before beginning their annual summer migration to keep livestock in the Balikh valley. They would return four months later to recollect them. According to elderly Raqqawis, nobody dared take other people's belongings lest they anger the saint.

Uways has also been considered a mediator for Raqqawis, especially during unsolved cases of theft or valuable objects disappearing. In such cases, there would be ritual procession involving a large copper cup, called the "Uways Cup", covered by a green sheet and carried by a public crier (or dallal) chosen by the wronged family. The procession would then go through all the streets of Raqqa, with the dallal calling out for anyone who knew anything about the theft or missing object was "called upon, by the Uways Cup, to inform me of it or to return it". During these processions, the entire city would be regarded as a sacred space.

== Economy ==
Before the civil war, the city and the countryside around it had been one of the country’s main breadbaskets, producing large amounts and varieties of crops. After the liberation of the city, widespread infrastructural damage and a complex security environment in the city has stunted the overall economic growth.

Reconstruction and development under the DAANES

In 2022, Saddam al-Ali, co-chair of the Raqqa Civil Council's Committee on Local Government and Communities, announced that 50 percent of services such as reconstruction, electricity and water supply have already been completed. The European Union's Agency for Asylum described the economic developments in early 2024 as ‘still slowly recovering from the devastation’.

Over the years various projects have been undertaken by the Autonomous Administration's Economic Authority and the Kongreya Star to revitalize life, economic development and woman's empowerment in the city. These include an olive oil processing plant in the north of the city, a drying plant, a cotton factory, the construction of six dried fruit and grain warehouses in the rural areas, a fodder factory, a mill, as well as numerous bakeries. Jineological projects include, the Al-Fardos Cooperative, which aims to care for the needy of Raqqa, Naya Detergent Factory, whose income will be used for new projects promoting women's employment, Ribûi El-Xeyr Cooperative, which gives women displaced by the Turkish invasion of Rojava job opportunities, and Zenobiya Women’s Bakeries. As of October 2024, 30 bridges and ferries, located on agricultural drains, irrigation canals and the Euphrates river including the most important of which is the old Raqqa Bridge have been repaired.

== Education ==
In late January 2026, a branch of Al-Furat University was opened in Raqqa. The campus includes six faculties: Civil engineering, Arts and Humanities, Science, Education, Agriculture, Pharmacy, Law, and Economics. It is the first university established in the Raqqa Governorate.

== Media ==
The Islamic State banned all media reporting outside its own efforts, kidnapping and killing journalists. However, a group calling itself Raqqa Is Being Slaughtered Silently operated within the city and elsewhere during this period. In response, ISIL has killed members of the group. A film about the city made by RBSS was released internationally in 2017, premiering and winning an award at that year's Sundance Film Festival.

In January 2016, a pseudonymous French author named Sophie Kasiki published a book about her move from Paris to the besieged city in 2015, where she was lured to perform hospital work, and her subsequent escape from ISIL.

== Transportation ==
Prior to the Syrian civil war the city was served by Syrian Railways.

== Climate ==
Climate data for Raqqa
Month	Jan	Feb	Mar	Apr	May	Jun	Jul	Aug	Sep	Oct	Nov	Dec	Year
Record high °C (°F)	18 (64)	22 (72)	26 (79)	33 (91)	41 (106)	42 (108)	43 (109)	47 (117)	41 (106)	35 (95)	30 (86)	21 (70)	47 (117)
Mean daily maximum °C (°F)	12 (54)	14 (57)	18 (64)	24 (75)	31 (88)	36 (97)	39 (102)	38 (100)	33 (91)	29 (84)	21 (70)	16 (61)	26 (79)
Mean daily minimum °C (°F)	2 (36)	3 (37)	5 (41)	11 (52)	15 (59)	18 (64)	21 (70)	21 (70)	16 (61)	12 (54)	7 (45)	4 (39)	11 (52)
Record low °C (°F)	−7 (19)	−7 (19)	−2 (28)	2 (36)	8 (46)	12 (54)	17 (63)	13 (55)	10 (50)	2 (36)	−2 (28)	−5 (23)	−7 (19)
Average precipitation mm (inches)	22 (0.9)	18.2 (0.72)	24.3 (0.96)	10.2 (0.40)	4.5 (0.18)	0 (0)	0 (0)	0 (0)	0.1 (0.00)	3.1 (0.12)	12.4 (0.49)	13.6 (0.54)	108.4 (4.31)
Average precipitation days	7	6	5	5	2	0	0	0	0.1	2	3	6	36.1
Average relative humidity (%)	76	72	60	53	45	34	38	41	44	49	60	73	54
Source 1:
Source 2:

Raqqa is featuring an arid, hot desert climate.

== Notable locals ==
- Al-Battani, astronomer, astrologer and mathematician (c. 858–929)
- Abdul-Salam Ojeili, novelist and politician (1918–2006)
- Harun al-Rashid, fifth Abbasid Caliph (786–809)
- Khalaf Ali Alkhalaf, poet and writer (born 1969)
- Yassin al-Haj Saleh, writer and dissident (born 1961)

== See also ==
- Battle of Callinicum
- Raqqa offensive (2016)
- Raqqa Is Being Slaughtered Silently
