= Hisn al-Tinat =

Medieval site in Hatay, Turkey

Ḥiṣn al-Tīnāt
- Tüpraş Field
- Location within Turkey
- 36°51′45″N 36°09′18.8″E
- Type: settlement, fortifications, harbor
- Cultures: Early Islamic, Middle Byzantine
- Location: Kinet Höyük, Hatay Province, Turkey
- Region: Plan of Issus, Cilicia

History
- Built: 8th century
- Abandoned: 12th century
- Event: Arab–Byzantine wars

Site notes
- Archaeologists: Asa Eger

Ḥiṣn al-Tīnāt (Arabic: حصن التينات, lit. 'fortress of the figs') was an Early Islamic to Middle Byzantine frontier settlement located on the eastern Cilician coastal plain. It is identified with the archaeological site known as the Tüpraş Field, near Kinet Höyük, in the Hatay Province of modern Turkey. The site was active roughly from the mid-8th century to the early 12th century CE, when it functioned as a settlement with a fortified core within the Islamic–Byzantine frontier. During this period, it linked inland Anatolia with Syria and the maritime network of the eastern Mediterranean. It also served as a coastal port specializing in the export of timber.

== Geography and location ==
Hisn al-Tinat was located on the southern Plain of Issos, a narrow coastal strip between the Amanus Mountains and the Bay of İskenderun in southeastern Anatolia. The region formed a transport corridor between Anatolia (via the Cilician Gates) and Syria (via the Syrian Gates and the Amuq Plain). In the Middle Ages, this area was part of the Islamic–Byzantine frontier, or al-thughūr. The climate, which is among the most humid in Turkey, allowed for the growth of forests in the Amanus Mountains, turning the area into a major timber-producing zone from ancient to medieval times.

The site lies near the mouths of several short rivers descending from the Amanus, creating marshes, lagoons, and the environment suitable for building ports and exporting timber. During the period in question, the coastline lay several hundred meters inland of the modern shore, allowing to anchor ships at the site.

== History and archaeology ==
Hisn al-Tinat seems to have been a de novo Early Islamic foundation, not built atop a Roman or Byzantine city. That is considered unusual for frontier sites in Cilicia and the western thughūr. During the Roman period, Issus was instead located south of Kinet Höyük, near the bridge complex of Kırık Köprü. In the early Islamic period, the settlement moved northward in response to the migration of rivers, expansion of marshes, and other changes in the environment that took place in the Late Roman era.

Excavations point to multiple occupation phases. The earliest (Phase IV) dates from the early Islamic period, in the mid-8th century to the mid-10th century. Remains from this period include substantial fortification walls, domestic buildings, storage areas, and port activity, including timber remains, waterfront deposits, and amphorae.

The site was taken by the Byzantine Empire sometime after 969, during its reconquest of Cilicia and Antioch. The site's next phase (Phase III) dates from the 10th to the 11th century CE. It is a transitional, early Islamic/Middle Byzantine phase, with internal rebuilding and mixed material culture. The latest era (Phases II-I) dates from the 11th to the early 12th century CE. This is a well-defined Middle Byzantine fortified enclosure (ca. 25x25 meters) with towers and buttresses, later destroyed by fire.

Smaller findings from the site include Early Islamic glazed wares, Abbasid-period imports from Syria, Iraq and Egypt, brittleware cooking pots, coins, iron tools, and evidence for fishing, animal husbandry, and timber processing.

Today, the site is largely buried beneath alluvial deposits, agricultural fields, and modern industrial installations.

== Research history ==
Hisn al-Tinat was long known from medieval texts in Arabic, from authors such as Ibn Hawqal, Istakhri and Al-Maqdisi. These scholars described the site as a coastal fortress and timber-export center. However, its precise location long remained uncertain. Earlier scholarship tentatively identified it with Kinet Höyük, but this was disproven by excavations showing that site had a misaligned occupational chronology.

Systematic research at the site began with geomorphological studies in the 1990s and 2000s, which clarified coastal change and river migration. In 2005, an intensive survey was conducted at Kırık Köprü, identifying Roman and Late Roman Issus south of Kinet Höyük. Finally, in 2006 and 2008, excavations were carried out at Tüpraş Field. These works, led by Asa Eger, allowed to confirm the site was Early Islamic and Middle Byzantine Hisn al-Tinat.

== See also ==
- Arab–Byzantine wars
- Hisn Maslama

== Bibliography ==
=== Sources ===
- Eger, Asa (2010). "Ḥiṣn al-Tīnāt on the Islamic-Byzantine Frontier: Synthesis and the 2005–2008 Survey and Excavation on the Cilician Plain (Turkey)". Bulletin of the American Schools of Oriental Research (357): 49–76. ISSN 0003-097X.
