= Qasr al-Banat =

Archaeological site in Raqqa, Syria

- Qasr al-Banāt.
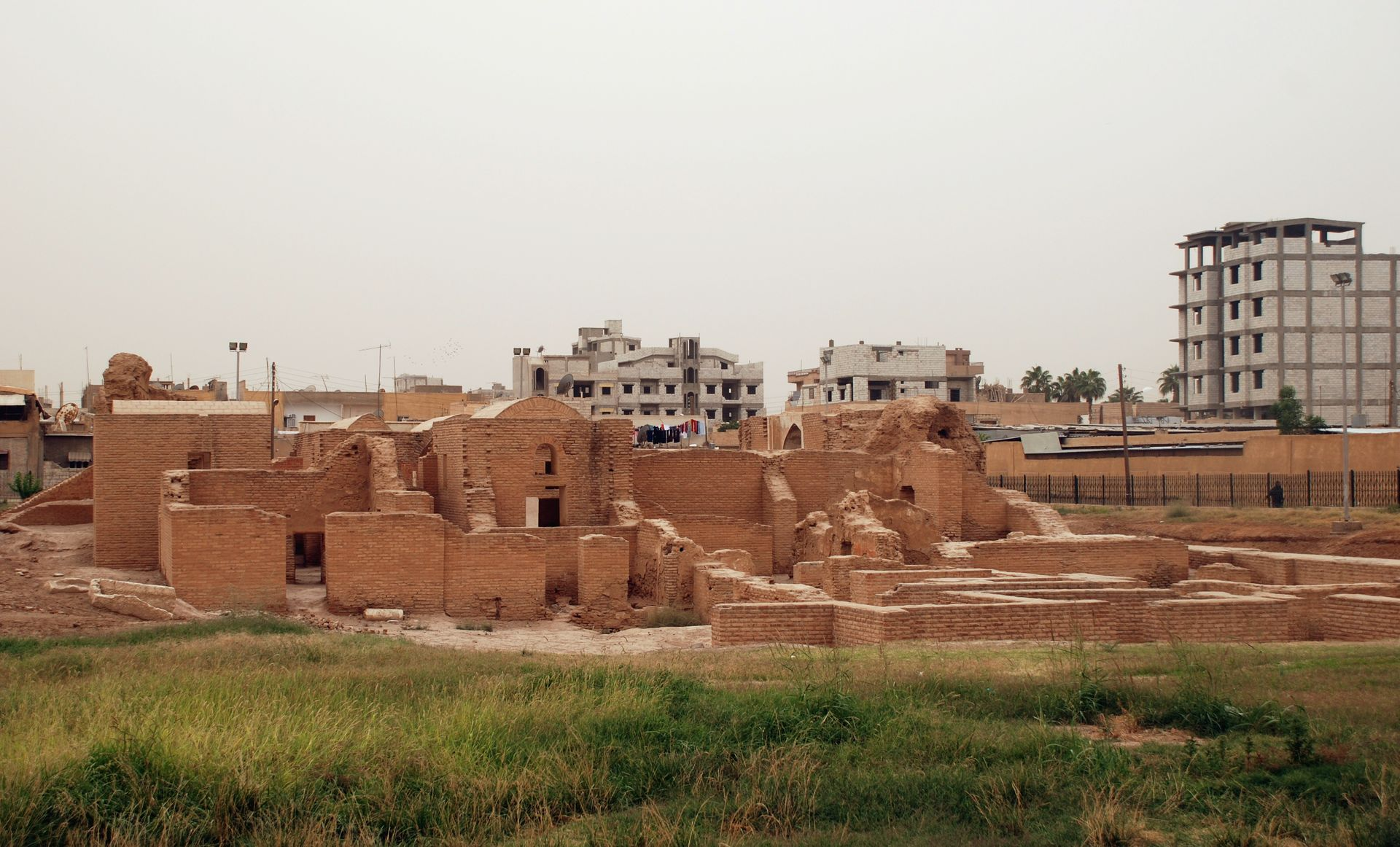

- Location within Syria
- 35.947826°N 39.026352°E
- Cultures: Islamic
- Location: Raqqa, Syria
- Region: Raqqa Governorate

Site notes
- Excavation dates: 1907, 1909, 1977–1982
- Archaeologists: Ernst Herzfeld, Friedrich Sarre, Gertrude Bell, Kassem Toueir
- Condition: Ruins
- Public access: Yes

Qasr al-Banat, Girls castle or Palace of the Ladies (Arabic: قَصْر ٱلْبَنَات, romanized: Qaṣr al-Banāt), are a set of brick ruins of a residence dating from the 12th century in the city of Raqqa.

== Location ==
The building is located in the former fortified town, about 150 metres (490 ft) west of the eastern wall and 400 metres (1,300 ft) north of the Baghdad Gate. When in the 1970s the modern city began to expand rapidly, the entire historic area was overbuilt. The archaeological complex at Qasr al-Banat was urbanized with new housing so that only an open space of 80 metres (260 ft) wide and 200 metres (660 ft) long remained.

== History ==
The Roman-Byzantine city of Callinicum was conquered by the Arabs in 639 CE and renamed Raqqa ("the flood plain"). The Umayyad caliph Hisham ibn Abd al-Malik (r. 723–743) is said by medieval sources to have built two palaces nearby. The Abbasid Caliph al-Mansur (r. 754–775), later called the city ar-Rafiqa ("the partner") and used it as a fortress against the Byzantines, building and attaching horseshoe-shaped walls on the straight side of the south wall that runs parallel to the former river bed of the Euphrates. Ar-Rafiqa became the residence of Harun al-Rashid (r. 786–809). He set up a palace outside the city walls in the northeast. After this period, a renovation was carried out in 1165/66 under Nur ad-Din Mahmud. The ruins present today have been dated to around 1168, from Nur al-Din's time.

By 1900, the ruins of Raqqa were repeatedly examined and documented by the likes of Ernst Herzfeld, who along with Friedrich Sarre conducted an archaeological survey of Mesopotamia between the Euphrates and the Tigris in 1907. They explored Raqqa in detail and a little later, in 1909, Gertrude Bell also visited the site, then largely an uninhabited ruin.

The site was significantly damaged in 2012-2017, during the Syrian civil war. Parts of the structure and the central fountain were destroyed and the site was also subject to looting.

In 2026, volunteers participating in the community initiative titled "play on ruins", managed to partially clear debris from the site.

== Style ==
The building is composed of various vaulted halls that lead to a central courtyard in Ayyubid ornamental form. The building's construction is of Iranian origin and was very rare in 12th century Syria. The well under Nur ad-Din in Damascus displays a similar form, which was widespread in Iran in mosques, palaces and sarays, in the center of their complexes.

The northern main hall fills the entire width of the courtyard divided into a three aisles. Surrounding it are a total of 41 irregular rooms that are not symmetrical. From 1977 to 1982 Kassem Toueir excavated and rebuilt the site for the Syrian Department of Antiquities. The walls and arches now visible are mainly reconstructed from newly fired bricks. One original diagonal wall segment remains, with a three-story stucco, where the various remains of the past are superimposed on the modern, with some ancient muqarnas and stepped arched niches still recognisable. When Friedrich Sarre and Ernst Herzfeld visited the site in 1907, followed by Gertrude Bell in 1910, they found this part of the building as a single upright on an otherwise flat ruin.

The area is fenced and is normally closed, but visible from all sides.

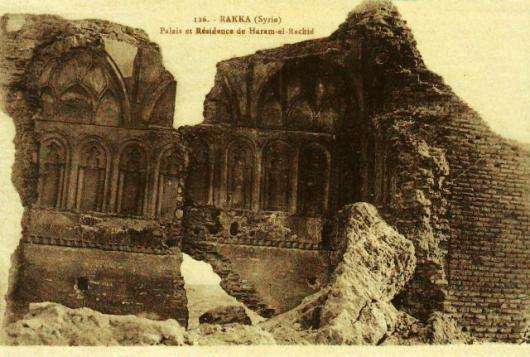
Photo of the ruins in 1936, with more of the vaulting still standing

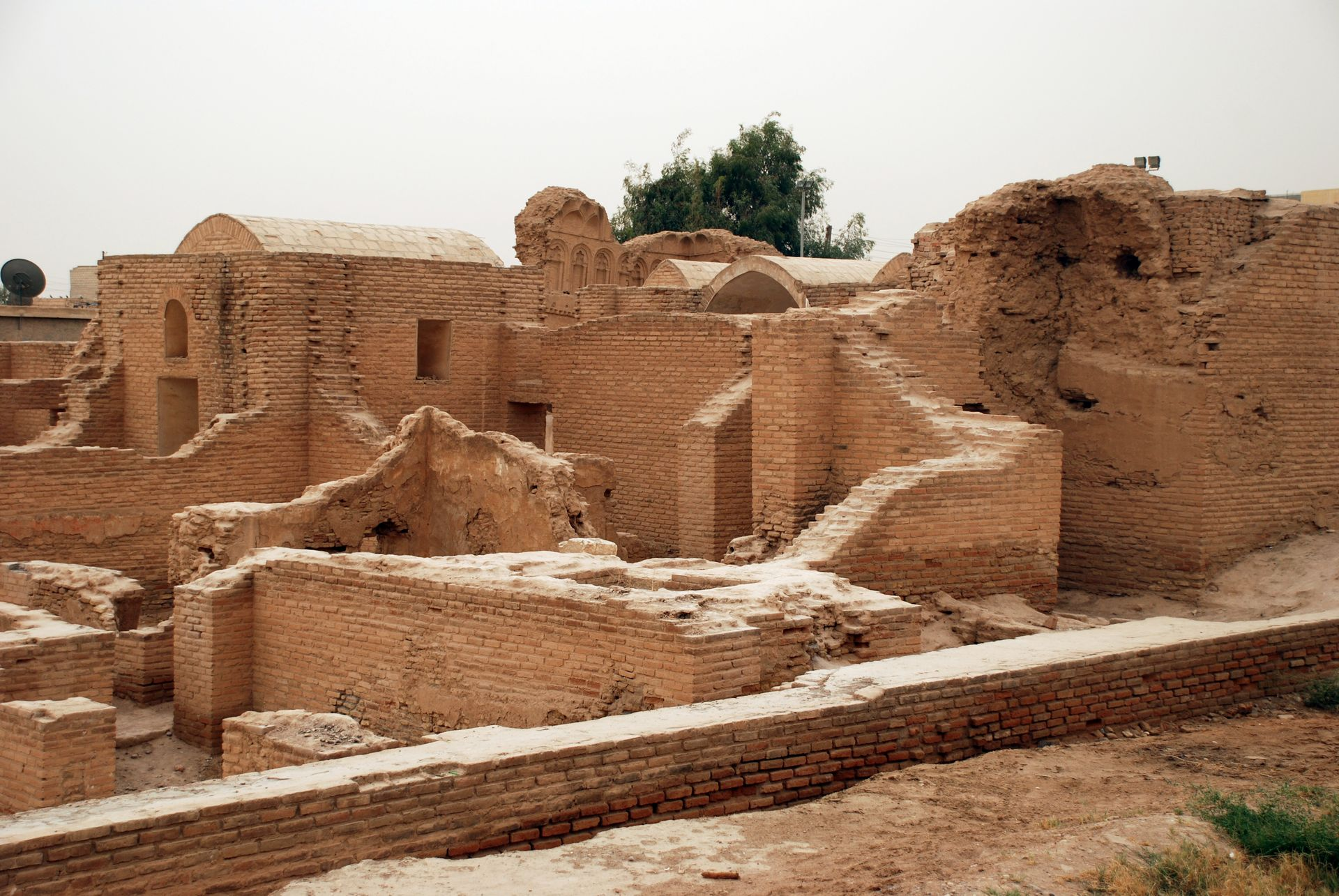
Reconstruction with newly fired bricks. Part of original wall in center. View from the northwest.

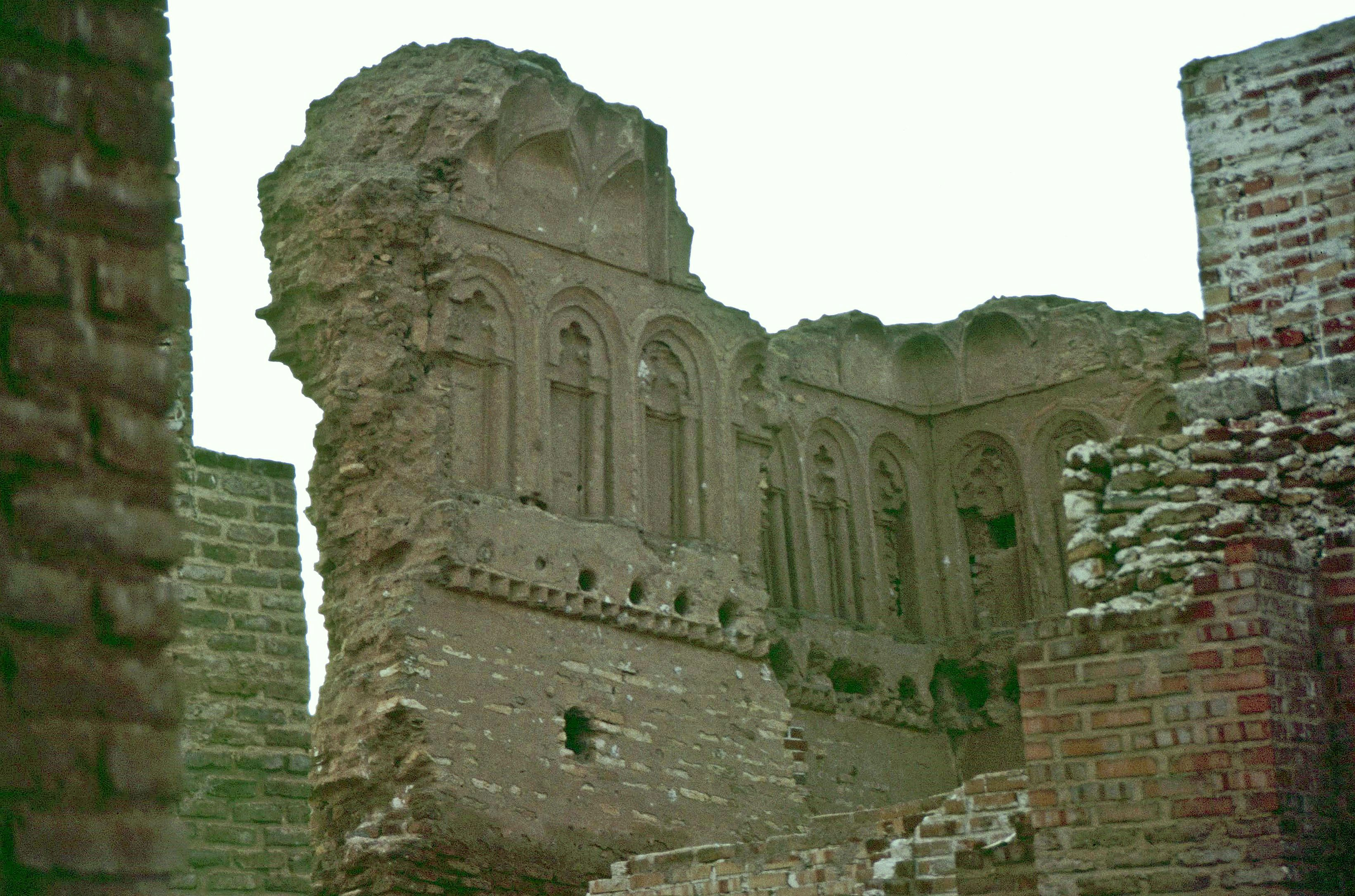
View of the niches and muqarnas decoration remains
