= Gil Stein (archaeologist) =

American archaeologist

- Occupations: Rowe Professor in Ancient Near Eastern Studies, The University of Chicago

Academic background
- Education: Yale University (BA); University of Pennsylvania (PhD)

Gil Stein (born January 9, 1956) is an American archaeologist. He was director of the Institute for the Study of Ancient Cultures (then Oriental Institute) at the University of Chicago from 2003 to 2017.

Stein received a B.A. from Yale University in 1978 and a Ph.D. in 1988 from the University of Pennsylvania. In 1990, he was appointed an assistant professor at the Department of Anthropology at Northwestern University, and in 2001 became a full professor at the same department. In 2002, he moved to the University of Chicago.

From 2008 to 2010, he jointly directed the Joint Syrian-American Archaeological Research Project at Tell Zeidan of the Ubaid culture. In 2017, Stein was appointed Senior Advisor to the Provost for Cultural Heritage at the University of Chicago. Since 2013, Stein has directed the Surezha Project at Girdi Surezha spanning the Halaf to Late Chalcolithic cultures.

== Publications ==
- Rethinking World Systems - Diasporas, Colonies, and Interaction in Uruk Mesopotamia, Tucson: University of Arizona, 1999. ISBN 0-8165-2009-7
- The Archaeology of Colonial Encounters: Comparative Perspectives. School of American Research Press, 2005.

== Awards ==
- National Science Foundation Graduate Fellow
- Fulbright Scholar in Turkey (1982–83)
