= Tall Mahra =

Tall Maḥrā was a small city of the central Balikh River valley, in what is now northern Syria, inhabited from the Hellenistic period until about the 13th century. It is identified with the 21-hectare tell now called Tall Shaykh Hasan, also romanized as Tell Sheikh Hasan. Karin Bartl did a survey of the site's ceramics in the 1990s, and the Syrian Antiquities Service also conducted excavations here by digging a few test trenches. Tall Mahra peaked under the Abbasid Caliphate, when it was the main town between Raqqa and Hisn Maslama on the way to Harran. It is best known as the birthplace of Dionysius I Telmaharoyo, the 9th-century Syriac Orthodox Patriarch of Antioch.

The oldest pottery fragments found at Tall Mahra date from the Hellenistic period. Later, it formed a Christian settlement under the Byzantine Empire. The Late Roman/Byzantine settlement (from the 3rd/4th until 7th centuries) covered perhaps 7 ha. The only remains found from this period were two mud-brick walls, covered in lime plaster, under a street on the eastern side of the tell. These walls were probably also used during the Umayyad period. A few 7th-century Byzantine coins were also found at the site.

Like other sites in the region, Tall Mahra underwent significant expansion during the Abbasid period. This was likely prompted by Harun al-Rashid moving his court to Raqqa in 796, which created a new demand for agricultural produce and stimulated the region's economy in general. Under the Abbasids, Tall Mahra expanded to a size of 21 hectares. This was its greatest extent, and Abbasid potsherds cover the entire tell.

Fragments of the city's stone walls are visible from the surface; they presumably date from the Abbasid period. They enclose an almost perfectly square area of 450x450m. The walls contain projecting half-towers, similar in design to the ones at al-Rafiqah in Raqqah, except these ones serve virtually zero defensive purpose. They instead seem to have been "symbols of urban pride and wealth in [a] small rural town". In addition to the monumental walls, Tall Mahra had a church, a small mosque, and a quadriburgium of unknown function. Also, above the Byzantine mud-brick walls on the east side, a series of stone buildings was built during the Abbasid period. These were perhaps used as shops.

The latest dated items found at Tall Mahra are from the 11th-13th centuries. The 13th-century geographer Yaqut al-Hamawi described Tall Mahra as a fortified town with a market lying between Raqqa and Hisn Maslama.

Near the site of Tall Mahra is Tell Shahin, a tell covering 13.6 hectares that was inhabited at a roughly similar time: from early Abbasid times until the Ayyubid era.

The site has now been heavily looted.

== See also ==
- Hisn Maslama
- al-Jarud
- Bajarwan (Syria)
- Bajadda
