= Yazid ibn Asid ibn Zafir al-Sulami =

Arab general and governor of Abbasid Caliphate

- Died: after 779/780
- Relatives: Asid ibn Zafir al-Sulami (father)
- Military career
- Allegiance: Abbasid Caliphate
- Service years: c. 750 – c. 780
- Wars: Arab–Khazar wars Arab–Byzantine wars

Yazid ibn Asid ibn Zafir al-Sulami or Yazid ibn Usayd ibn Zafir al-Sulami (Arabic: يزيد بن أسيد السلمي) was an Arab general and governor in the service of the early Abbasid Caliphate. He was active mostly in the Caliphate's northwestern frontier region, serving as governor of Arminiya and the Jazira and fighting against the Byzantine Empire and the Khazars.

== Biography ==
Yazid was a member of the Banu Sulaym tribe, which had participated in the Muslim conquest of Armenia and been settled by the caliphs in the western Armenian borderlands with the Byzantine Empire. Yazid's father, Asid (or Usayd) ibn Zafir al-Sulami, had been a general in the service of the Umayyads, and served under the last Umayyad caliph, Marwan ibn Muhammad, and his father, Muhammad ibn Marwan, in their campaigns in the region. Al-Baladhuri further reports that his mother was a Christian, the daughter of the "Patrician of Siwnik", who had been taken captive during Muhammad ibn Marwan's campaigns.

Despite his close ties to the Umayyads, Yazid became a close and trusted advisor to the Abbasid prince Abu Ja'far, the future Caliph al-Mansur (r. 754–775), during the early years of the Abbasid regime. Yazid hence served thrice as governor of Arminiya (a huge province encompassing most of Arab-controlled Transcaucasia), in 752–754, 759–770, and 775–780. Under al-Mansur, he also served concurrently as governor of Mosul (and apparently of the entire Jazira).

As governor of the Caliphate's Caucasian provinces, Yazid played a central role in the brief recurrence of conflict with the Khazar Khaganate, the Caliphate's northern neighbour: in 759 or 760, in an effort to improve relations with the Khazars, al-Mansur ordered him to marry a daughter of the Khazar khagan. Baghatur gladly accepted and sent her south with a large and rich escort, as well as 100,000 dirhams as her dowry. The marriage indeed took place, but after two years the princess and her two children suddenly died, and the khagan suspected that she had been poisoned. As a retaliation, he launched devastating raids south of the Caucasus in 762–764: under the leadership of a Khazarian tarkhan named Ras, the Khazars devastated Caucasian Albania, Armenia, and Iberia, where they captured Tiflis. Yazid gathered a large army against them and marched against them but he was defeated and his entire army was destroyed in the Battle of Shirvan. Yazid himself managed to escape capture, but the Khazars returned north with thousands of captives and much booty. Yazid also campaigned with distinction against the Byzantines, recovering the city of Theodosiopolis/Qaliqala, which had been captured by the Byzantine emperor Constantine V, in the 750s, and leading summer raids into Asia Minor in 772, 774 and 779.

Nothing is known of him after 779/780, but his family remained influential in their homelands until the end of the 9th century, and his sons, Khalid and Ahmad, also served as governors in Armenia, as did his grandson Abdallah ibn Ahmad al-Sulami.

== Sources ==
- Brook, Kevin Alan (2006). The Jews of Khazaria, Second Edition. Plymouth: Rowman & Littlefield Publishers, Inc. ISBN 978-0-7425-4982-1.
- Crone, Patricia (1980). Slaves on Horses: The Evolution of the Islamic Polity (1980 ed.). Cambridge: Cambridge University Press. ISBN 978-0521229616.
- Kennedy, Hugh N. (1986). The Early Abbasid Caliphate: A Political History. London and Sydney: Croom Helm. ISBN 0-7099-3115-8.
- Kennedy, Hugh, ed. (1990). The History of al-Ṭabarī, Volume XXIX: Al-Mansūr and al-Mahdī, A.D. 763–786/A.H. 146–169. SUNY Series in Near Eastern Studies. Albany, New York: State University of New York Press. ISBN 978-0-7914-0142-2.
- Ter-Ghewondyan, Aram (1976) [1965]. The Arab Emirates in Bagratid Armenia. Translated by Garsoïan, Nina. Lisbon: Livraria Bertrand.
