= Al-Jarud =

Coordinates: 36°35′0″N 39°35′0″E

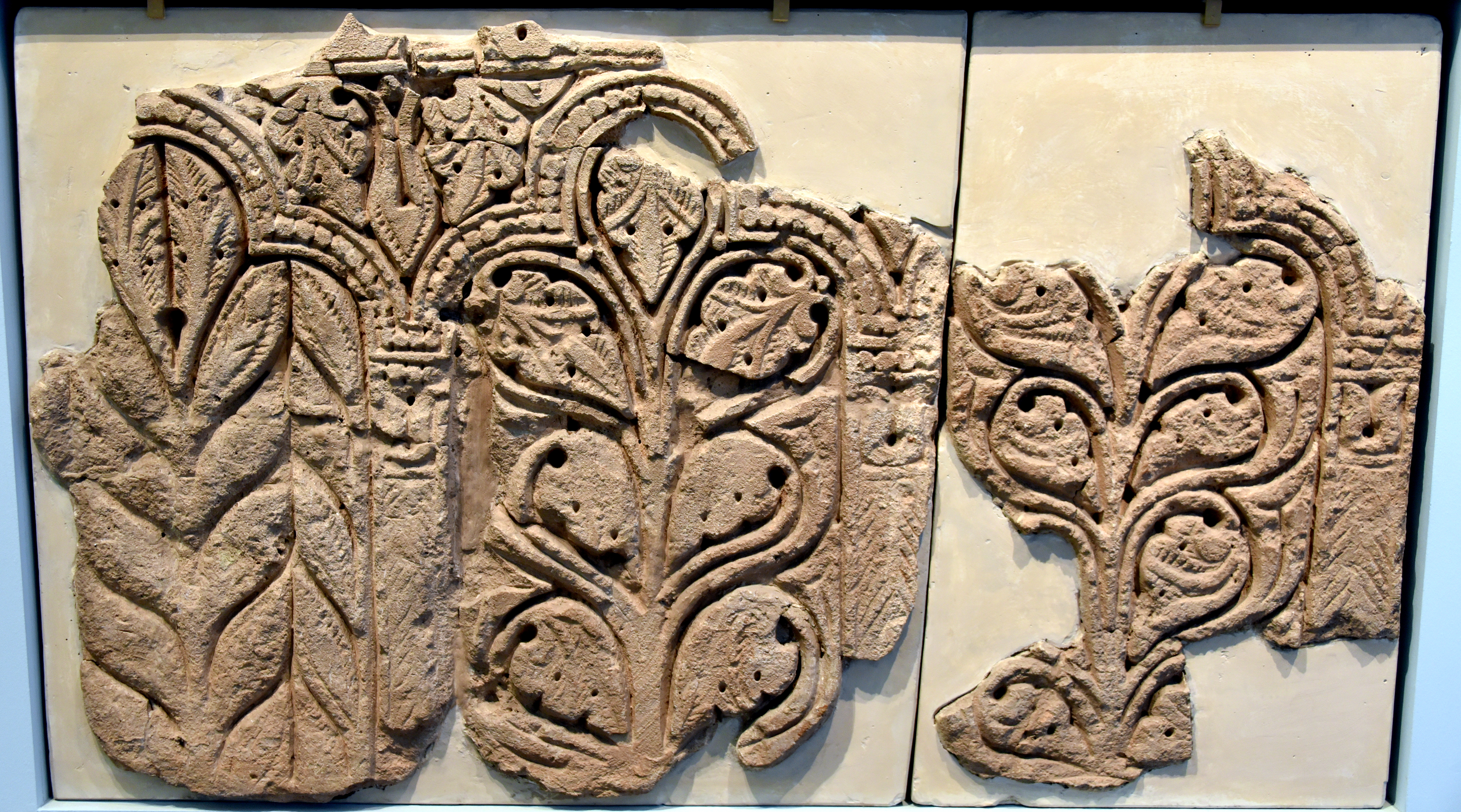
Remains of carved stucco wall decorations found at Kharab Sayyar, identified with al-Jarud.

al-Jārūd was a small-town in the Wadi Hamar area, about 40 km east of the Balikh River in present-day Syria, inhabited during the 9th century. It is identified with Kharāb Sayyār, a ruin covering 42 hectares. The remains of its rectangular-shaped fortification with protruding half-round towers are the most prominent feature. At its peak, during the mid-9th century, al-Jarud was a regional center situated along an east-west running traffic and trading route and was embedded in a well settled, agricultural landscape. At least 60 contemporary settlements have been identified within a 13 km radius.

== History ==
The site and its surroundings have been explored and excavated as a joint mission of the Directorate-General of Antiquities & Museums (DGAM Syria) and the Goethe-University Frankfurt between 1997 and 2011 (Directors: Imad Mussa and Jan-Waalke Meyer). Meyer originally proposed that occupation at the site began during the Umayyad period, perhaps in the 730s or 740s, but has since revised his chronology to exclude an Umayyad phase at al-Jarud. Although there is evidence of multiple phases, only the peak phase of the settlement can be dated with relative certainty. According to Stefan Heidemann, who studied the coin finds of Kharab Sayyar excavation, al-Jarud was only built "to any significant extent" in the middle of the 9th century. At this point, the Abbasid capital was in Samarra, and the demand for agricultural produce was at its peak. The latest dated numismatic evidence found at al-Jarud is a coin fragment dated to the reign of al-Mu'tadid, between the years 892 and 902, and was probably abandoned not too long after that. This timeframe of the main phase of the settlement – the last in most of the buildings – is mostly supported by the dating of the undecorated pottery by C. Falb and that of the stucco decorations by A.Koppel.

== Layout ==
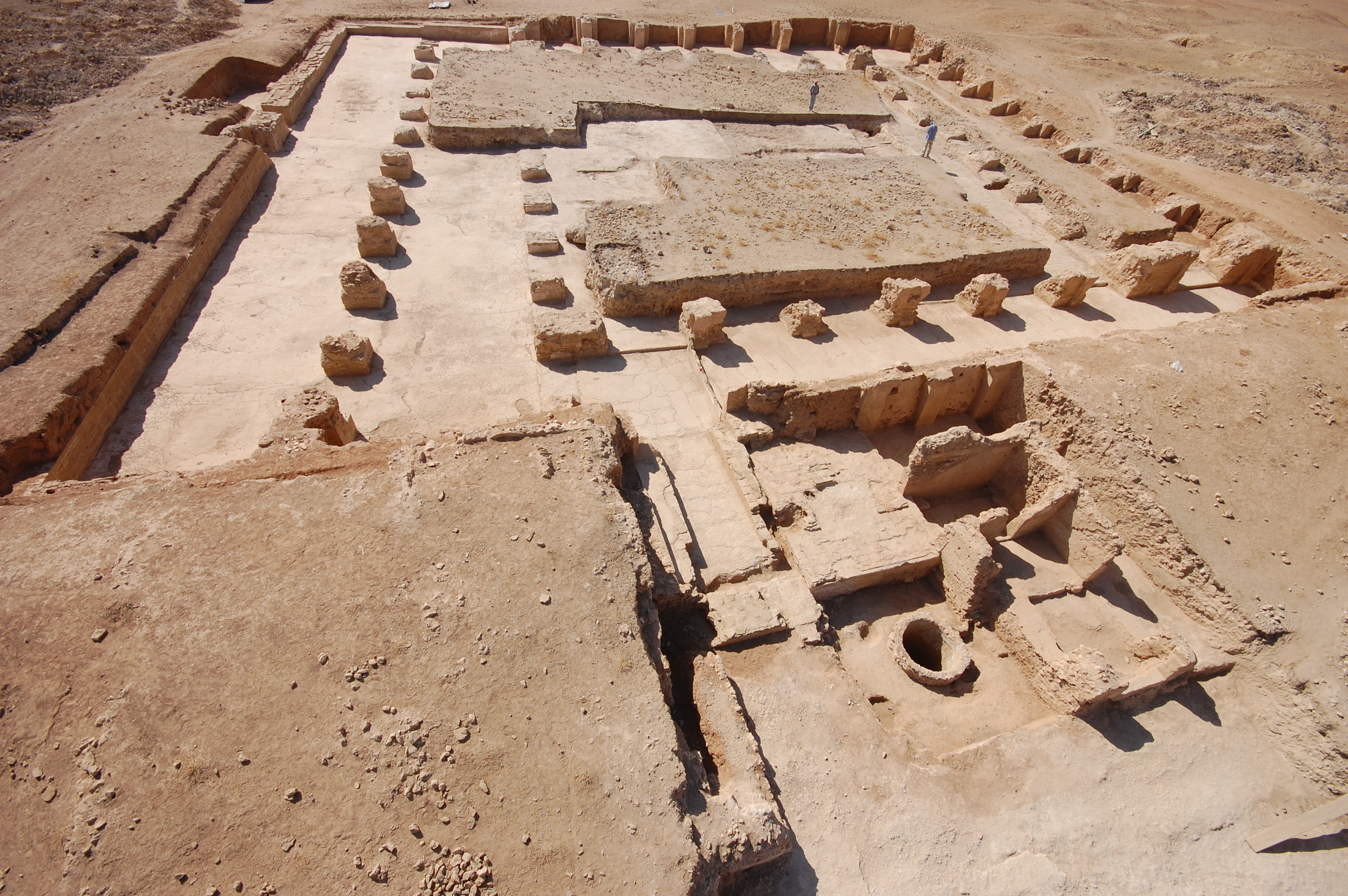
The ruin of the mosque of Kharab Sayyar (al-Jarud) with remains of the market and adjacent buildings in the foreground. Image by B. Ciftci during the 2007 excavation.

Al-Jarud was surrounded by a rectangular city wall, measuring approximately 650 x 650 m and featured projecting half-towers. A geophysical survey revealed a large number of the structures inside the walls, as well as some on the outside. Excavations in the northwestern part of the town revealed a mosque and a segment of a market with adjacent buildings. On the western stretch of the fortification, a gate and a stretch of the fortification have been uncovered. Towards the centre of the town, a bathhouse was uncovered. In the northwestern part of the town, the remains of at least seven residential buildings as well as those of a small mosque have been excavated. Two larger buildings, one situated in the southwest, the second on top of the third millennium tell, located in the south-eastern corner of the walled area, have been explored with smaller excavation. Additionally, numerous features of the water supply-system have been excavated. Two rooms of the residential buildings as well as parts of the mosque in the northwest of the town were decorated with stucco that shares similarities with decorations found in Samarra.

== See also ==
- Hisn Maslama
- Tall Mahra
- Bajarwan (Syria)
- Bajadda
