= Raqqa Museum =

Museum in Raqqa, Syria

- مَتْحَفُ الرَّقَّةِ
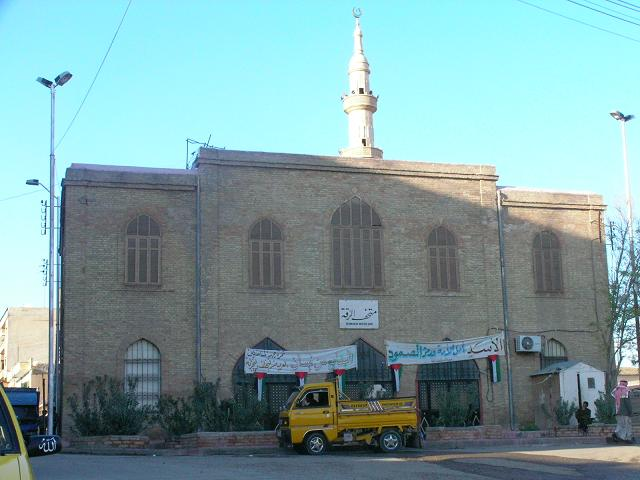
- The Museum of Raqqa
- Established: 1981
- Location: Raqqa, Raqqa Governorate, Syria
- Coordinates: 35°56′45″N 39°1′00″E
- Website: raqqa-museum.com

The Archeological Museum of Raqqa, also known as the Raqqa Museum (Arabic: مَتْحَفُ الرَّقَّةِ, romanized: Matḥaf ar-Raqqah), is a museum in Raqqa, Syria founded in 1981. The structure housing the museum was built in 1861 and served as an Ottoman governmental building. The museum is dedicated to the preservation of the culture of the Raqqa Governorate.

The museum notably curates large collections gathered from the excavation researches led in the region of Tell Sabi Abyad, Tell Bi'a, Tell Chuera, Tell Munbaqa, and various artefacts dating back to Roman and Byzantine times, as well as more recent objects from the Islamic period (notably the epoch of Haroun al-Rachid) and from the time of the bedouin domination. Its first floor has three sections: Ancient, Classical Vestiges and Modern Art; and the second floor is dedicated to Arab and Islamic art.

At its peak, the museum housed some 7,000 artifacts from the surrounding regions. The Syrian Civil War caused damage to the museum with many of its items being stolen and destroyed during ISIL's rule over Raqqa. After the capture of the city by the Syrian Democratic Forces in October 2017, the Raqqa Civil Council and its "Committee of Culture and Antiquities" in cooperation with the Vision (Ro’ya) Organisation, has started to restore the building and track down its stolen artifacts, beginning in early 2018.

== See also ==
- List of museums in Syria
