= Asid ibn Zafir al-Sulami =

Jaziran general

- Occupation: General
- Era: Umayyad Caliphate
- Children: Yazid
- Relatives: Khalid (grandson); Ahmad (grandson); Abdallah (great-grandson)

Asid ibn Zafir al-Sulami (Arabic: أسيد بن زافر السلمي) was a Jaziran general of the Umayyad Caliphate who fought in Transcaucasia under Muhammad ibn Marwan and his son, Marwan ibn Muhammad, in the early 8th century. His origin is unknown, but his descendants remained important in the region for long after. This his son Yazid and his grandsons, Khalid and Ahmad, served as governors of Arminiya.

== See also ==
- Bajadda

== Sources ==
- Crone, Patricia (1980). Slaves on Horses: The Evolution of the Islamic Polity (1980 ed.). Cambridge: Cambridge University Press. p. 165. ISBN 978-0521229616.
