= Ahmad ibn al-Tayyib al-Sarakhsi =

9th century Persian historian and philosopher

- Born: Sarakhs
- Died: 899 CE
- Occupations: Traveler, Historian, Philosopher

Ahmad ibn al-Tayyib al-Sarakhsi (Persian: أحمد بن الطيب السرخسي; died 899 CE) was a Persian traveler, historian and philosopher from the city of Sarakhs. He was a pupil of al-Kindi.

Al-Sarakhsi was killed by Caliph al-Mu'tadid because, according to an anecdote preserved in Yaqut al-Hamawi's Mu'jam al-Udaba', he had urged the caliph towards apostasy. Al-Biruni reports in his Chronology that al-Sarakhsi had written books in which he denounced prophecy and ridiculed the prophets, whom he styled charlatans. However, Rosenthal has disputed the historicity of the stories that claim al-Sarakhsi was executed for heretical beliefs.
