= Battle of Derbent (731) =

Battle in the 730s

- Part of the Second Arab–Khazar War
Date	731
Location	Derbent
Result	Umayyad victory

Belligerents
Khazar Khaganate	Umayyad Caliphate

Commanders and leaders
Barjik (WIA)	Maslama ibn Abd al-Malik; Sulayman ibn Hisham; Marwan ibn Muhammad; Al-Abbas ibn al-Walid

Casualties and losses
Heavy	Low

The Battle of Derbent was fought around 731 near the city of Derbent. The Umayyad army, commanded by the prince Maslama ibn Abd al-Malik, was victorious and repelled the Khazars from Derbent.

== Prelude ==
In the year 731, the Umayyad general, Maslama ibn Abd al-Malik, launched his new campaign against the Khazars. Fresh forces from Khazaria arrived with 1,000 Khazars who managed to occupy the citadel of Derbent. The Umayyad governor of Derbent, al-Harith ibn 'Amr al-Tai', was not able to prevent them. Maslama ordered him to watch over them. Meanwhile, Maslama launched a new campaign into Khazar's territory. The Umayyads began launching raids into Khazaria. The cities of Khamzin, Balanjar, and Samandar were abandoned and occupied by the Umayyads. Their success didn't last long. A large Khazar army led by the Khagan Barjik was marching to meet the Umayyads. Maslama decided to retreat. To deceive the enemy, he ordered the campfires to be kept burning until dawn, and he and his army, abandoning their tents and heavy baggage, set off on a forced march. In a single day, the Arabs covered a distance equal to two normal daily marches and, "at their last gasp," barely reached Derbent alive. The Khazars chased them to the city.

== Battle ==
Maslama began arranging his army into battle formations. He appointed Sulayman ibn Hisham on the left wing, Marwan ibn Muhammad took the right wing, and al-Abbas ibn al-Walid took the center. The battle began; the local chiefs with the forces bore the attack, and the Umayyads held their ground and repelled the Khazars all day. Marwan distinguished himself during the battle. Later, a Khazar deserted his army and informed Maslama of the location of the Khagan. He was seated in a covered wagon behind brocade curtains; its floor was covered with expensive carpets, and a golden pomegranate sparkled on top.

Maslama appointed a handpicked detachment of brave men under Thabit al-Nahrani, who fought their way through the dense ranks of guards protecting the Khagan to this wagon. The Umayyads managed to wound the Khagan, but he was able to escape successfully from them. Seeing this, the Umayyads charged at the Khazars and routed them, giving them clear dominance on the field.

== Aftermath ==
Afterwards, Maslama turned to the Khazars in Derbent and poisoned the wells, which forced them to escape from there. Afterwards, Maslama began distributing the quarters for the Umayyads soldiers.

== Sources ==
- Dunlop, D. M (1954), The history of the Jewish Khazars.
- Artamonov, M. I. (1962). История хазар [History of the Khazars].
- Khalid Yahya Blankinship (1994), The End of the Jihâd State, The Reign of Hishām Ibn ʻAbd Al-Malik and the Collapse of the Umayyads.
