= Maslama ibn Abd al-Malik =

8th century Umayyad prince and military leader

Maslama ibn Abd al-Malik مسلمة بن عبد الملك

Governor of al-Jazira, Arminiya and Adharbayjan
- In office 709–721
- Monarchs: Al-Walid I (r. 705–715); Sulayman (r. 715–717); Umar II (r. 717–720); Yazid II (r. 720–724)
- Preceded by: Muhammad ibn Marwan
- Succeeded by: Al-Jarrah ibn Abdallah al-Hakami
- In office 725–729
- Monarchs: Yazid II; Hisham (r. 724–743)
- Preceded by: Al-Jarrah ibn Abdallah al-Hakami
- Succeeded by: Al-Jarrah ibn Abdallah al-Hakami
- In office 730–732
- Monarch: Hisham
- Preceded by: Al-Jarrah ibn Abdallah al-Hakami
- Succeeded by: Marwan II

Governor of Iraq
- In office 720–721
- Monarch: Yazid II
- Preceded by: None (Note: Iraq was subdivided under separate governors for Basra and Kufa in 717–720. Before that period, it was governed as a single province under Yazid ibn al-Muhallab (military affairs) and Salih ibn Abd al-Rahman (fiscal affairs), in 715–717.)
- Succeeded by: Umar ibn Hubayra

Personal details
- Died: 24 December 738 Syria, Umayyad Caliphate
- Spouse: Al-Rabab bint Zufar ibn al-Harith al-Kilabi
- Children: Muhammad; Yazid; Sa'id; Sharahil
- Parents: Abd al-Malik ibn Marwan (father); Unnamed slave concubine (mother)

Military service
- Allegiance: Umayyad Caliphate
- Branch/service: Umayyad army
- Battles/wars: Arab–Byzantine wars; Siege of Tyana; Siege of Constantinople; Umayyad invasions of Asia Minor; Arab–Khazar wars; Battle of Derbent

Maslama ibn Abd al-Malik (Note: Arabic: مسلمة بن عبد الملك, romanized: Maslama ibn ʿAbd al-Malik, in Greek sources Μασαλμᾶς, Masalmas) (fl. 705 – 24 December 738) was an Umayyad prince and one of the most prominent Arab generals of the early decades of the 8th century, leading several campaigns against the Byzantine Empire and the Khazar Khaganate. He achieved great fame especially for leading the last Arab siege of the Byzantine capital Constantinople.

Maslama launched his military career leading the annual summer raids against the Byzantines in Anatolia. By 709, he was governor over Qinnasrin (northern Syria), the Jazira (Upper Mesopotamia), Armenia, and Adharbayjan, giving him control over the Caliphate's northern frontier. From this position, he launched the first Arab expeditions against the Khazars across the Caucasus. Maslama's brother, Caliph Sulayman, appointed him to lead the campaign to capture Constantinople in 715, but it ended in disaster for the Arabs and he was ordered to withdraw by Sulayman's successor, Umar II, in 718.

After his brother Yazid II (r. 720–724) came to power, Maslama was sent to suppress the revolt of Yazid ibn al-Muhallab in Iraq. Although successful, Maslama was recalled in 721, due to the Caliph's concerns over Maslama's growing power as governor of Iraq. Maslama was excluded from the line of succession because his mother was a slave concubine, but he secured the accession of his other brother, Hisham (r. 724–743). Under Hisham, Maslama resumed the campaigns against the Byzantines and the Khazars, with mixed results. In 732, he was replaced by his cousin, the future caliph Marwan II (r. 744–750).

Maslama was granted extensive estates by his brothers, investing considerable sums to reclaim and develop agricultural lands in Balis, the Balikh valley, and the marshlands of southern Iraq. The estates were inherited by his descendants, but were mostly confiscated by the Abbasid dynasty after they toppled the Umayyads in 750. Nonetheless, out of respect for Maslama's battlefield reputation, his descendants were largely spared from the Abbasids' wide-scale persecutions of the Umayyad family.

== Family background ==
Maslama was a son of the Umayyad caliph Abd al-Malik ibn Marwan (r. 685–705) and half-brother of the caliphs al-Walid I (r. 705–715), Sulayman (r. 715–717), Yazid II (r. 720–724) and Hisham (r. 724–743). Maslama himself was excluded from the line of succession as his mother was a slave concubine. Around 691, Abd al-Malik arranged Maslama's marriage to al-Rabab, the daughter of the Qaysi tribal chief Zufar ibn al-Harith al-Kilabi, as part of the settlement to end Zufar's revolt against the Umayyads.

== First command in the northwestern frontier ==
=== Campaigns against the Byzantines ===
Map of the Arab-Byzantine frontier zone

Maslama is first mentioned as leading, along with his nephew al-Abbas ibn al-Walid, the annual summer campaign (sa'ifa; pl. sawa'if) against the Byzantine Empire in 705. His first major expedition was the 707–708 campaign against the Byzantine city of Tyana in southeastern Asia Minor, which was launched in retaliation for the defeat and death of the distinguished general Maimun the Mardaite the year before. The siege lasted through winter and the Arab army faced great hardship, but after the Arabs defeated a Byzantine relief force in spring 708, the city surrendered. A few months later, in the summer, Maslama led another expedition into Asia Minor and defeated a Byzantine army near Amorium, while in 709 he raided into the region of Isauria.

In the same year, Maslama was appointed military governor of the Jazira (Upper Mesopotamia), Armenia and Adharbayjan, succeeding his uncle Muhammad ibn Marwan. This he added to the post of governor of Jund Qinnasrin in northern Syria, which he already held during his father's reign. His governorship of Qinnasrin was not as well-documented by early Arabic chroniclers as his other posts. Together, command of these provinces effectively gave him complete control of the Caliphate's entire northwestern border. From this position he launched several campaigns against the Byzantines, devastating Galatia and sacking Amaseia in 712, and taking Melitene in 714.

=== War with the Khazars ===
Maslama was also the first to establish the Caliphate's presence north of the Caucasus, leading to the commencement of direct conflict with the Khazars. Sources date the resumption of the conflict as early as 707 with a campaign by Maslama in Adharbayjan and up to Derbent (known in Arabic as Bab al-Abwab, 'Gate of Gates'). Further attacks on Derbent are reported by different sources in 708 by Muhammad ibn Marwan and the following year again by Maslama.

In 713/14, Maslama led an expedition which captured Derbent, reportedly after a resident showed him a secret underground passage. The Armenian historian Łewond claims that the Arabs, realizing that they could not hold the fortress, razed its walls. Maslama then drove deeper into Khazar territory. The Khazar khagan confronted the Arabs at the city of Tarku but, apart from a series of single combats by champions, the two armies did not engage for several days. The imminent arrival of Khazar reinforcements under the general Alp' forced Maslama to quickly abandon his campaign and retreat to Iberia, leaving his camp with all its equipment as a ruse.

The early Muslim sources generally credit Maslama with leading the Hajj pilgrimage to Mecca in 713, though his nephew Abd al-Aziz ibn al-Walid is also cited as the leader that year. Leadership of the sawa'if and the annual Hajj were both prestigious commands, which under the Umayyads were almost exclusively held by prominent members of the dynasty.

== Siege of Constantinople ==
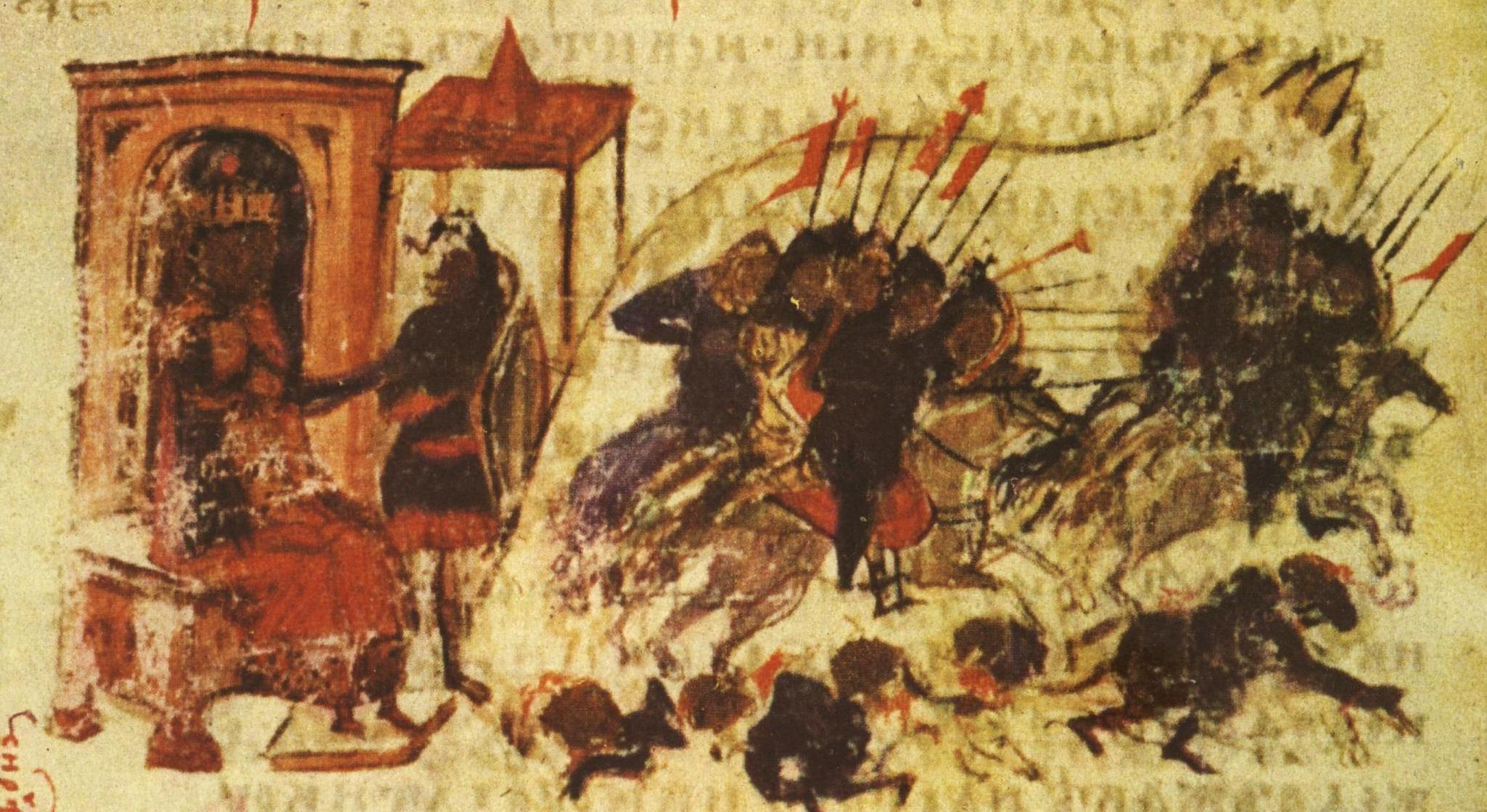
The Arab attack on Constantinople, from the Manasses Chronicle

From 715 Maslama was the leading general in the plans of his brother, Caliph Sulayman, to conquer the Byzantine capital, Constantinople, as Sulayman himself was too ill to lead the campaign in person. Maslama led a huge army, which sources report to have numbered 120,000 men and 1,800 ships. In late 715, the Arab vanguard crossed the Taurus Mountains into Byzantine territory, Maslama following in spring 716 with the main army and the fleet. The Arabs' plans were aided by the recurrence of civil strife, which had plagued the Byzantines since 695; Emperor Anastasius II was overthrown by Theodosius III in 715, who was in turn opposed by the strategos of the Anatolic Theme, Leo the Isaurian. Maslama hoped to use the divisions among the Byzantines for his own benefit and initiated contacts with Leo, but the latter used the negotiations to outwit the Arab general and occupied for himself the strategic city of Amorium, which Maslama had intended to use as his winter base. As a result, Maslama marched further west, to the coastlands of the Thracesian Theme. There he spent the winter, while Leo marched against Theodosius in Constantinople, which he entered in March 717.

In early summer 717, Maslama with his army crossed from Asia into Europe over the Dardanelles, and proceeded to besiege Constantinople from land and sea. His navy, however, was soon neutralized by the use of Greek fire, and as his army was unable to overcome the city's land defences, the siege continued into the winter, which was especially severe that year, with snow covering the ground for three months. Maslama had brought along many supplies, but they either soon ran out or were lost—Arab accounts make much of Leo tricking the Arab general yet again during negotiations into handing over or destroying a significant part of his hoarded supplies—and the army began to suffer from hunger and disease.

In spring, reinforcements arrived in the form of two large fleets from Egypt and Ifriqiya, but a large part of their crews, who were mostly conscripted Christians, went over to the Byzantines, and Leo's navy destroyed or captured the Arab fleets. The Byzantines also defeated an Arab army marching to aid the besiegers through Asia Minor, while Maslama's troops contended with attacks by the Bulgars as well, costing them many men. The siege had failed, and the new Caliph, Umar II (r. 717–720), ordered Maslama to retreat. On 15 August 718, after thirteen months of siege, the Arabs departed.

== Governorship in Iraq ==
After his failure at Constantinople, Maslama was dispatched to Iraq to quell the Kharijites, an Islamic sect opposed to the Umayyads. Following Umar's death and the accession of his brother Yazid II in 720, he was tasked with suppressing the mass Iraqi revolt led by Yazid ibn al-Muhallab, whom he defeated and killed in August 720. As governor of Iraq, a major provincial office whose authority extended over the eastern half of the Caliphate, Maslama championed the Qays in their factional conflict with the Yaman, whose interests Ibn al-Muhallab had represented. Maslama dismissed all the Yamani sub-governors of Iraq and the eastern provinces and voided all the orders Ibn al-Muhallab had issued while in office. Maslama soon fell out of favour with the Caliph, who resented and feared his power as governor of Iraq, as well as his interference in the caliphal succession: Maslama favoured his brother Hisham over Yazid's son al-Walid. Yazid recalled Maslama from his post, ostensibly because he had failed to deliver his provinces' tax haul to the caliphal capital, Damascus, and replaced him with Maslama's Qaysi protege, Umar ibn Hubayra al-Fazari.

== Second command in the northwestern frontier ==
=== Raids against Byzantium and the sack of Caesarea ===
Maslama then disappears from the sources and re-emerges in 725, shortly after Yazid's death and the accession of Hisham, who sent Maslama to replace the veteran general al-Jarrah ibn Abdallah al-Hakami in the Caucasus front against the Khazars. Initially, however, Maslama was mostly active in the Byzantine front, and the war against the Khazars was delegated to al-Harith ibn Amr al-Ta'i. In winter 725, Maslama led an expedition against Asia Minor from Melitene, which culminated in the sack of Caesarea on 13 January 726. Along with the capture of Gangra by Abdallah al-Battal in 727, this was one of the major successes of Arab arms against the Byzantines in the 720s. A few months later, he also led the otherwise unremarkable northern sa'ifa into Byzantine territory.

=== Fighting the Khazars, 727–728 ===
Map of the Caucasus region c. 740

Maslama's attention was then diverted to the Khazar front, where 726 had seen major Khazar invasions into Albania and Adharbayjan. Both sides escalated their commitment in 727: Maslama for the first time confronted the khagan himself. The Arabs took the offensive, probably reinforced with Syrian and Jaziran troops. Maslama recovered the Darial Pass and pushed into Khazar territory, campaigning there until the onset of winter forced him to return to Adharbayjan.

A second invasion in the following year, ended in what the historian Khalid Yahya Blankinship calls a "near disaster". Arab sources report that the Umayyad troops fought for thirty or forty days in the mud, with continuous rain, before defeating the khagan on 17 September 728. The impact of their victory is questionable, however; Maslama was ambushed by the Khazars upon his return, and the Arabs abandoned their baggage train and fled through the Darial Pass to safety.

After this campaign, Maslama was replaced as governor yet again by al-Jarrah. Despite his energy, Maslama's campaigns failed to produce the desired results; by 729, the Arabs had lost control of northeastern Transcaucasia and were again on the defensive, with al-Jarrah having to defend Adharbayjan against a Khazar invasion. He is then recorded by the Byzantine chronicler Theophanes the Confessor as having been responsible for the sack of the fortress of Charsianon in late 730, but Arab sources credit Mu'awiya ibn Hisham for this act.

== Third command in the northwestern frontier ==
In the Caucasus, the situation quickly deteriorated after Maslama's departure. While al-Jarrah campaigned north of the Caucasus, the Khazars swung behind him and attacked his main base, Ardabil. Hastening to relieve the city, al-Jarrah was defeated and killed, and his army practically annihilated in a battle outside the city on 9 December 730.

With Khazar detachments ranging unopposed as far as Mosul, Caliph Hisham again appointed Maslama as governor of Armenia and Adharbayjan to fight the Khazars. While Maslama was assembling his force, the veteran general Sa'id ibn Amr al-Harashi was sent to try and halt the Khazar advance. Sa'id was able to do more than that, defeating the dispersed Khazar forces, and recovering towns and prisoners. Sa'id's unexpected success angered Maslama; Łewond writes that Sa'id had won the war and received what glory (and booty) there was to be had. Sa'id was relieved of his command in early 731 by Maslama and imprisoned at Qabala and Bardha'a, charged with endangering the army by disobeying orders, and was released only after the caliph intervened on his behalf.

At the command of a large army, Maslama took the offensive. He restored the provinces of Albania to Muslim allegiance (after punishing the inhabitants of Khaydhan who resisted him) and reached Derbent, where he found a Khazar garrison of 1,000 men and their families. Leaving al-Harith ibn Amr al-Ta'i to keep watch there, Maslama advanced north. Although details of this campaign may be conflated in the sources with his earlier 728 campaign, he apparently took Khamzin, Balanjar, and Samandar before being forced to retreat after a confrontation with the main Khazar army under the khagan. Leaving their campfires burning, the Arabs withdrew in the middle of the night and quickly reached Derbent in a series of forced marches. The Khazars shadowed Maslama's march south and attacked him near Derbent, but the Arab army (augmented by local levies) resisted until a small, elite force attacked the khagan's tent and wounded him. The Muslims, encouraged, then defeated the Khazars.

=== Re-foundation of Derbent ===
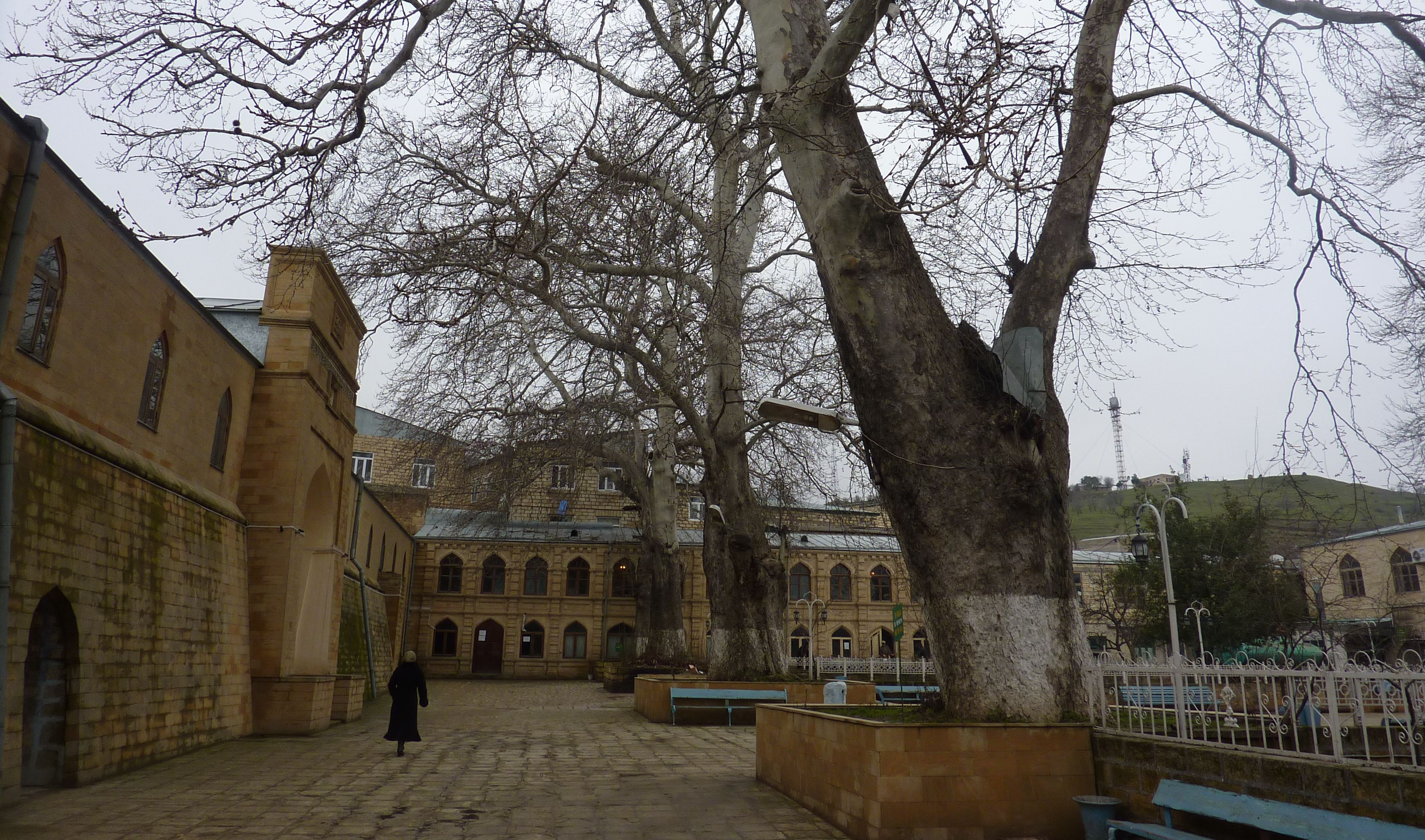
The Friday Mosque of Derbent (Bab al-Abwab), dating to the city's re-foundation by Maslama

Taking advantage of his victory, Maslama poisoned the water supply of Derbent to drive the Khazar garrison out. He re-established the city as an Arab military colony (misr), restoring its fortifications and garrisoning it with 24,000 troops, mostly from Syria, divided into quarters by their district (jund) of origin. Leaving his relative Marwan ibn Muhammad (later the last Umayyad caliph, from 744 to 750) in command at Derbent, Maslama returned with the rest of his army south of the Caucasus for the winter.

Despite the capture of Derbent, Maslama's was apparently unsatisfactory to Hisham, who replaced his brother in March 732 with Marwan ibn Muhammad.

== Retirement ==
Maslama thereafter retired from public life, possibly to his extensive estates in northern Syria. He backed Hisham's attempts to install his son, Abu Shakir Maslama, as his successor, in place of the heir apparent, Yazid II's son al-Walid. Maslama died on 24 December 738. With his death, Hisham lost a major supporter for his succession plans in the Umayyad family. Al-Walid acceded after Hisham's death in 743.

== Legacy ==
Maslama was among "the most celebrated generals of the Umayyad house", in the words of the historian Patricia Crone. As the commander of the great assault on Constantinople and the "founder of Islamic Derbent", for over twenty years in the early 8th century, Maslama was "one of the principal props of Umayyad power and a foremost actor on the stage of the East", according to the historian Douglas M. Dunlop. His fame spread far and wide in the Muslim world, and his exploits and chivalry passed into legend.

=== Legendary traditions ===
In later traditions, Maslama's fortification of Derbent was parallelized with the similar efforts by the 6th-century Sasanian monarch Khosrow Anushirvan and even with Alexander the Great's legendary 'Wall of Alexander', meant to keep Gog and Magog (here equated with the Khazars) at bay. His activity in the region ensured his continued presence in the traditions of North Caucasus Muslims. Thus, according to the 13th-century geographer Zakariya al-Qazwini, Muslims went on pilgrimage to a mosque near Derbent where a sword reputed to have belonged to Maslama was kept in its mihrab.

Maslama's attempt to capture Constantinople in particular became celebrated in later Muslim literature, with several surviving accounts, mostly semi-fictional, in which the historical defeat was transformed into a sort of victory: Maslama was said to have departed only after symbolically entering the Byzantine capital on his horse accompanied by thirty riders; Leo received him with honour and led him to the Hagia Sophia, where the emperor paid homage to the Arab general. The tales of the siege influenced similar episodes in Arabic epic literature, where Maslama appears associated with Abdallah al-Battal, another legendary Arab hero of the wars against Byzantium. His campaign against Constantinople continued to provide inspiration to later Muslim authors, from the Muhadarat al-Abrar ascribed to the 13th-century Andalusian mystic Ibn Arabi, to the khamsa of the 17th-century Ottoman poet Nargisi.

Furthermore, Byzantine tradition, as recorded in the 10th-century De Administrando Imperio, held that during the siege Maslama convinced the Byzantines to build Constantinople's first mosque, near the city's praetorium. In reality, the mosque near the praetorium was most likely erected in about 860, as a result of an Arab embassy in that year. It survived down to the sack of the city by the Fourth Crusade. Later Ottoman tradition also ascribed the building of the Arap Mosque (located outside Constantinople proper in Galata) to Maslama, although it erroneously dated this to around 686, probably confusing Maslama's attack with the first Arab siege in the 670s.

=== Land development and reclamation projects ===
Several Umayyad princes were granted estates by the caliphs, usually land of little value, which the princes developed for profit. Abd al-Malik or al-Walid I granted Maslama an estate at Balis and its environs, where agriculture was rain-dependent. The previous inhabitants of Balis had fled the town during the early 7th-century Muslim conquest and it was re-settled by Syrian Arab tribal warriors who converted to Islam. Upon his own initiative or per the inhabitants' request, Maslama revitalized the lands by digging a canal there, called Nahr Maslama after him, to irrigate its fields, and built a wall around Balis. The estate was not subject to the land tax (kharaj) paid by non-Muslims; it paid the minimal tithe (ushr) to the state. Maslama collected one third of the remaining yield, the rest going to the inhabitants, who were effectively sharecroppers.

An extensive former canal that was excavated near the site of Dibsi Faraj (medieval Qasirin), in the 1970s, has been identified with Nahr Maslama. The canal ran parallel to the Euphrates river, corresponding with medieval accounts tracing Nahr Maslama's route from Balis through Qasirin to the site of Siffin (Tell Abu Hureyra). The 8th-century Syriac Chronicle of Zuqnin mentions that Maslama built several villages and forts along the canal. The early Muslim sources mention one fortified village he founded, Na'ura (Waterwheel), between Balis and Aleppo, which has not been identified. It remained inhabited at least until the 10th century. Between his frequent military campaigns and his other estates in Syria and the Jazira, it is unlikely Maslama spent significant time in Balis before his retirement. In his absence, the Umayyads at Balis were led by his brother Sa'id al-Khayr.

Maslama founded the dual site of Hisn Maslama and Bajadda on both sides of the Balikh River valley. There, he built a fortified compound and dug a canal, also known as Nahr Maslama, to transport water from the Balikh to a large cistern which supplied the new town, whose inhabitants were Muslim landed settlers. He granted Bajadda to one of his Qaysi lieutenants, Asid ibn Zafir al-Sulami, who further developed it. Hisn Maslama, which Maslama probably used as one of his residences, was probably abandoned after the mid-9th century.

Another of Maslama's major land reclamation projects was in the marshes of southern Iraq. There, frequent breaches of embankments caused mass flooding, which ruined the farmlands of the region. Al-Walid I would not fund the restoration of the farms due to the high cost, estimated to be 3,000,000 dirhams. Instead, Maslama volunteered to pay the sum in exchange for the Caliph granting him the land. Maslama drained the marshes by digging a canal and brought farmers to cultivate the reclaimed lands, enabling his estates to prosper. According to the historian Hugh N. Kennedy, Maslama "clearly recouped his investment, presumably from a share of the crops". (Note: Maslama's estates in Iraq's marshlands were confiscated by the Abbasids after they took power in 749–750. They were granted to the Abbasid prince Dawud ibn Ali and were inherited by his descendants, from whom one of the Abbasid caliphs purchased them.)

=== Building works ===
The historian Jere L. Bacharach speculates that Maslama was the most likely founder of the Umayyad Mosque of Aleppo, whose original construction is otherwise attributed to al-Walid I or Sulayman. Most of the present structure dates to the 12th–13th centuries. Bacharach bases his view on Maslama's governorship of Qinnasrin and his possible use of Aleppo as a base for the sawa'if, for which a congregational mosque to serve the troops would have made sense. The Umayyad-era qasr (castle) in Balis, a fortified residence with a canal and a wool production center, was possibly a construction by Maslama or Sa'id al-Khayr. Maslama may have been responsible for some construction works in the town of Qinnasrin. In Damascus, he had an iwan (enclosed hall) called after him alongside the residences of other Umayyad dynasts, including the caliphal Khadra Palace, situated behind the Umayyad Mosque.

=== Descendants ===
Maslama's descendants inherited his estates and continued living in northern Syria after his death. In the aftermath of the Abbasid Revolution, which toppled the Umayyads in 750, an Abbasid officer harassed Maslama's family and seized his fortified residence at Na'ura. The incident provoked the Qaysi allies of Maslama's family, led by Zufar ibn al-Harith's grandson Abu al-Ward, to revolt against the Abbasids. The revolt was soon after quashed and Maslama's estates were confiscated and transferred to the Abbasids. (Note: The first Abbasid caliph, al-Saffah (r. 750–754), transferred Maslama's Balis estates to the Abbasid prince Sulayman ibn Ali. They were inherited by the latter's son, Muhammad, but were confiscated by Caliph Harun al-Rashid (r. 786–809), who bequeathed them to his son, the later caliph, al-Ma'mun (r. 813–833). They remained with al-Ma'mun's descendants at least into the late 9th century.) Around the same time, a son of Maslama, Muhammad, raised a revolt in Harran, but it was also suppressed.

The Abbasid caliphs were nonetheless sympathetic toward the memory of Maslama and toward his family. This was probably due to Maslama's reputation as a sober Muslim and fame as a ghazi (warrior) against the Byzantines. His descendants remained in northern Syria, where several were still recorded in the sources around a century later. His grandson, Muhammad ibn Yazid al-Hisni, a poet, was spared by Caliph al-Mahdi when the latter visited Hisn Maslama in 780, despite making a slight toward the Abbasids in verse. One of Maslama's descendants, Maslama ibn Ya'qub, seized control of Damascus with the backing of Qaysi tribesmen and proclaimed himself caliph in c. 813, during the Great Abbasid Civil War. He was ousted shortly after and died in hiding. A 10th-century descendant of Maslama, Abu Bakr ibn al-Azraq, was a prominent poet in the Fatimid Caliphate and Umayyad Spain. (Note: Abu Bakr ibn al-Azraq lived in the Fatimid Caliphate and was imprisoned in Mahdia on suspicion of spying for his Umayyad relatives who ruled Muslim Spain. He escaped to the Umayyad caliphate in Spain in 954, later settled at the court of Caliph al-Hakam II (r. 961–976), and died in Cordoba in 995. He contributed significantly to the spread of Egyptian culture in Spain. His genealogy was traced to Maslama as follows: Muhammad ibn Ahmad ibn Muhammad ibn Abd Allah ibn Hamid ibn Musa ibn al-Abbas ibn Muhammad ibn Yazid ibn Muhammad ibn Maslama ibn Abd al-Malik.)

Family tree of Maslama ibn Abd al-Malik

Marwan I (r. 684–685)
Abd al-Malik (r. 685–705)	Abd al-Aziz	Muhammad
Al-Walid I (r. 705–715)	Sulayman (r. 715–717)	Maslama	Sa'id al-Khayr	Yazid II (r. 720–724)	Hisham (r. 724–743)	Umar II (r. 717–720)	Marwan II (r. 744–750)
Al-Abbas	Muhammad	Yazid	Sa'id	Sharahil (Note: Sharahil ibn Maslama ibn Abd al-Malik was imprisoned in Harran by Caliph Marwan II and was killed with other Umayyads while attempting to escape the prison in 750.)	Al-Walid II (r. 743–744)	Maslama
Muhammad al-Hisni	Muhammad
Ali
Ya'qub
Ibn al-Azraq	Maslama

Maslama ibn Abd al-Malik
Umayyad caliphs

== Sources ==
- Artamonov, M. I. (1962). Istoriia khazar История хазар [History of the Khazars] (in Russian). Leningrad: Izdatelʹstvo Gosudarstvennogo Ėrmitazha. OCLC 490020276.
- Bacharach, Jere L. (1996). "Marwanid Umayyad Building Activities: Speculations on Patronage". In Necipoğlu, Gülru (ed.). Muqarnas: An Annual on the Visual Culture of the Islamic World. Vol. 13. Leiden: Brill. pp. 27–44. ISBN 90-04-10633-2.
- Blankinship, Khalid Yahya (1994). The End of the Jihâd State: The Reign of Hishām ibn ʻAbd al-Malik and the Collapse of the Umayyads. Albany, New York: State University of New York Press. ISBN 978-0-7914-1827-7.
- Brooks, E. W. (1899). "The Campaign of 716–718 from Arabic Sources". The Journal of Hellenic Studies. XIX. The Society for the Promotion of Hellenic Studies: 19–33. doi:10.2307/623841. JSTOR 623841. S2CID 163360931.
- Canard, Marius (1926). "Les expéditions des Arabes contre Constantinople dans l'histoire et dans la légende". Journal Asiatique (in French) (208): 61–121. ISSN 0021-762X.
- Cobb, Paul M. (2001). White Banners: Contention in 'Abbasid Syria, 750–880. SUNY Press. ISBN 0-7914-4879-7.
- Crone, Patricia (1980). Slaves on Horses: The Evolution of the Islamic Polity (1980 ed.). Cambridge: Cambridge University Press. ISBN 978-0521229616.
- Dixon, 'Abd al-Ameer 'Abd (1971). The Umayyad Caliphate, 65–86/684–705: (a Political Study). London: Luzac. ISBN 978-0718901493.
- Dunlop, Douglas M. (1954). The History of the Jewish Khazars. Princeton, NJ: Princeton University Press. OCLC 459245222.
- Eger, A. Asa (2017) [2015]. The Islamic-Byzantine Frontier: Interaction and Exchange among Muslim and Christian Communities (Paperback ed.). New York and London: I. B. Tauris. ISBN 978-1-78453-919-1.
- Flood, Finbar Barry (2001). The Great Mosque of Damascus: Studies on the Makings of an Ummayyad Visual Culture. Leiden, Boston and Köln: Brill. ISBN 90-04-11638-9.
- Gordon, Matthew S.; Robinson, Chase F.; Rowson, Everett K.; Fishbein, Michael (2018). The Works of Ibn Wāḍiḥ al-Yaʿqūbī (Volume 3): An English Translation. Leiden: Brill. ISBN 978-90-04-35621-4.
- Guilland, Rodolphe (1959). "L'Expedition de Maslama contre Constantinople (717–718)". Études byzantines (in French). Paris: Publications de la Faculté des Lettres et Sciences Humaines de Paris: 109–133. OCLC 603552986.
- Haase, Claus-Peter (2006). "The Excavations at Madīnat al-Fār/Ḥiṣn Maslama on the Balikh Road". In Kennedy, Hugh (ed.). Muslim Military Architecture in Greater Syria From the Coming of Islam to the Ottoman Period. Leiden and Boston: Brill. pp. 54–60. ISBN 90-04-14713-6.
- Hasluck, F. W. (1929). "LVII. The Mosques of the Arabs in Constantinople". Christianity and Islam Under the Sultans, Volume II. Oxford: Oxford University Press. pp. 717–735.
- Heidemann, Stefan (2009). "Settlement Patterns, Economic Development and Archaeological Coin Finds in Bilad al-Sham: the Case of the Diyar Mudar – The Process of Transformation from the 6th to the 10th Century A.D.". In Bartl, Karin; Moaz, Abd al-Razzaq (eds.). Residences, Castles, Settlements. Transformation Processes from Late Antiquity to Early Islam in Bilad al-Sham Proceedings of the International Conference held at Damascus, 5–9 November 2006. Rahden: Verlag Marie Leidorf. pp. 517–538.
- Hinds, Martin, ed. (1990). The History of al-Ṭabarī, Volume XXIII: The Zenith of the Marwānid House: The Last Years of ʿAbd al-Malik and the Caliphate of al-Walīd, A.D. 700–715/A.H. 81–95. SUNY Series in Near Eastern Studies. Albany, New York: State University of New York Press. ISBN 978-0-88706-721-1.
- Kazhdan, Alexander, ed. (1991). The Oxford Dictionary of Byzantium. Oxford and New York: Oxford University Press. ISBN 0-19-504652-8.
- Kennedy, Hugh (2016). "Elite Incomes in the Early Islamic State". In Donner, Fred; Conrad, Lawrence I. (eds.). The Articulation of the Early Islamic State Structures. Abingdon, Oxon and New York: Routledge. pp. 135–150. ISBN 978-0-860-7872-11.
- Lammens, H. (1987). "Maslama". In Houtsma, Martijn Theodoor (ed.). E.J. Brill's First Encyclopaedia of Islam, 1913–1936, Volume V. Leiden: Brill. p. 394. ISBN 90-04-08265-4.
- Leisten, Thomas (2009). "For Prince and Country(side) – the Marwanid Mansion at Balis on the Euphrates". In Bartl, Karin; Moaz, Abd al-Razzaq (eds.). Residences, Castles, Settlements. Transformation Processes from Late Antiquity to Early Islam in Bilad al-Sham Proceedings of the International Conference held at Damascus, 5–9 November 2006. Rahden: Verlag Marie Leidorf. pp. 377–394.
- Lilie, Ralph-Johannes; Ludwig, Claudia; Pratsch, Thomas; Zielke, Beate (1998–2013). "Maslama ibn 'Abd al-Malik (# 4868)". Prosopographie der mittelbyzantinischen Zeit (in German). Berlin and Boston: De Gruyter. pp. 190–191.
- Makki, Mahmud Ali (1968). Ensayo sobre las aportaciones orientales en la España musulmana: y su influencia en la formación de la cultura hispano-árabe [Essay on the Eastern Contributions in Muslim Spain: and their influence in the Formation of the Hispano-Arab Culture] (in Spanish). Madrid: Instituto de Estudios Islámicos.
- Marsham, Andrew (2009). The Rituals of Islamic Monarchy: Accession and Succession in the First Muslim Empire. Edinburgh: Edinburgh University Press. ISBN 978-0-7486-2512-3.
- Powers, David S., ed. (1989). The History of al-Ṭabarī, Volume XXIV: The Empire in Transition: The Caliphates of Sulaymān, ʿUmar, and Yazīd, A.D. 715–724/A.H. 96–105. SUNY Series in Near Eastern Studies. Albany, New York: State University of New York Press. ISBN 978-0-7914-0072-2.
- Robinson, Chase F. (2010). "The Violence of the Abbasid Revolution". In Suleiman, Yasir (ed.). Living Islamic History: Studies in Honour of Professor Carole Hillenbrand. Edinburgh: Edinburgh University Press. pp. 226–251. ISBN 978-0-7486-3738-6.
- Rotter, G. (1991). "Maslama b. ʿAbd al-Malik b. Marwān". In Bosworth, C. E.; van Donzel, E. & Pellat, Ch. (eds.). The Encyclopaedia of Islam, Second Edition. Volume VI: Mahk–Mid. Leiden: E. J. Brill. p. 740. ISBN 978-90-04-08112-3.
- Shaban, M. A. (1971). Islamic History: Volume 1, AD 600–750 (AH 132): A New Interpretation. Cambridge: Cambridge University Press. ISBN 978-0-521-08137-5.
- Treadgold, Warren (1997). A History of the Byzantine State and Society. Stanford, California: Stanford University Press. ISBN 0-8047-2630-2.
- Uzquiza Bartolomé, Aránzazu (1994). "Otros Linajes Omeyas en al-Andalus". In Marín, Manuela (ed.). Estudios onomástico-biográficos de Al-Andalus: V (in Spanish). Madrid: Consejo Superior de Investigaciones Científicas. pp. 445–462. ISBN 84-00-07415-7.
- Vacca, Alison (2017). Non-Muslim Provinces under Early Islam: Islamic Rule and Iranian Legitimacy in Armenia and Caucasian Albania. New York: Cambridge University Press. ISBN 978-1-107-18851-8.
- Williams, John Alden, ed. (1985). The History of al-Ṭabarī, Volume XXVII: The ʿAbbāsid Revolution, A.D. 743–750/A.H. 126–132. SUNY Series in Near Eastern Studies. Albany, New York: State University of New York Press. ISBN 978-0-87395-884-4.
