= Al-Abbas ibn al-Walid =

Umayyad prince and general (died 750)

al-Abbas ibn al-Walid العباس بن الوليد

Governor of Jund Hims
- In office 705–715
- Preceded by: Abdallah ibn Abd al-Malik
- Succeeded by: Yazid ibn Husayn al-Sakuni

Personal details
- Died: 750 Harran, Umayyad Caliphate
- Relations: Umayyads (dynasty)
- Parent: al-Walid I (father)
- Relatives: Sulayman (uncle); Yazid II (uncle); Hisham (uncle); Maslama (uncle)

Military service
- Allegiance: Umayyad Caliphate
- Branch/service: Umayyad army
- Years of service: c. 707–720s
- Rank: General
- Battles/wars: Arab–Byzantine wars; Siege of Tyana; Umayyad invasions of Asia Minor; Revolt of Ibn al-Muhallab

al-ʿAbbās ibn al-Walīd ibn ʿAbd al-Malik (Arabic: العباس بن الوليد بن عبد الملك) was an Umayyad prince and general, the eldest son of Caliph al-Walid I. He distinguished himself as a military leader in the Byzantine–Arab Wars of the early 8th century, especially in the Siege of Tyana in 707–708, and was often a partner of his uncle Maslama ibn Abd al-Malik during these campaigns. He or his father are credited for founding the short-lived city of Anjar in modern Lebanon.

His fortunes declined under his father's successors, except for a relatively brief revival under Yazid II (r. 720–724). Nevertheless, he maintained a strong base in his old governorship of Homs and by the time of Caliph Hisham's death in 743, he was probably the leading figure in the ruling family, despite being ineligible for the caliphate himself due to his mother being a slave concubine. He became involved in the civil wars of the mid-740s, at first supporting then opposing Caliph al-Walid II, who was assassinated in 744. Abbas's brothers acceded to the caliphate in quick succession, but before the end of the year another Umayyad, Marwan II, took the throne and imprisoned Abbas for his role in the conspiracy against al-Walid II. He died in prison of an epidemic in 750.

== Origins ==
Abbas was the eldest son of the Umayyad caliph al-Walid I (r. 705–715). His mother was an umm walad (slave concubine). Information about her background in the early sources is limited, though one account identifies her as a Christian. The modern historian Garth Fowden identifies her as Greek. Abbas was often lampooned by his opponents as Nastus ibn Nastus, the Arabic version of the Greek name Anastasius, or as ibn Qustantin ('son of Constantine'). Little is known about his early life, and Arab and Byzantine sources are often at odds concerning details of his career.

== Expeditions against the Byzantines ==
He first appears in the 707 campaign against the important Byzantine fortress of Tyana in Cappadocia, where he led the Arab army alongside his uncle Maslama ibn Abd al-Malik. The town withstood a long siege over the winter of 707–708, and surrendered only after a Byzantine relief army was defeated in spring. During the latter battle, Abbas is said by Arab chroniclers to have distinguished himself for the crucial role he played in stopping the wavering Arabs from fleeing and driving them on to victory.

Abbas participated regularly in the almost annual expeditions launched into Byzantine Asia Minor during these years. His most notable campaigns were the capture of Sebaste in Cilicia in 712 and of Antioch in Pisidia in 713, the raid into Paphlagonia in 721 where he is reported to have captured 20,000 prisoners, and a raid, placed in 722/723 but possibly reflecting an earlier campaign, that captured a fortress called Siza.

== Relations with the caliphs ==
Besides his command roles in the Byzantine wars, Abbas was appointed by his father as governor of the military district of Homs. He was dismissed after al-Walid's death in 715 by the succeeding caliph, his uncle Sulayman ibn Abd al-Malik, under whom Abbas, like all of al-Walid's sons, fell out of favor. The hostility by the caliph toward Abbas is alluded to by a supposed speech made by the general and confidant of Sulayman, Yazid ibn al-Muhallab, who claimed to have prevented Sulayman from removing Abbas from the Marwanid family. Under Sulayman and his successor, Umar II, Abbas was precluded from any military roles, including the 717–718 Siege of Constantinople, the pinnacle of the Umayyad war effort against Byzantium, which was led by Maslama.

Abbas regained favor under his uncle Caliph Yazid II (r. 720–724), who reinstated him as a top commander on the Byzantine front and also as the co-leader of the Umayyad army which suppressed the major revolt of Yazid ibn al-Muhallab in Iraq in 720; the other lead commander was Maslama.

His renewed fortune was relatively short-lived, as he once again became sidelined by a new caliph, this time Yazid II's successor, Abbas's uncle Hisham (r. 724–743), under whose reign he did not participate in any military campaigns. Hisham's opposition to Abbas may have stemmed from Abbas's advocacy for his own brother, Abd al-Aziz ibn al-Walid, to succeed Yazid II, against the counsel of Maslama, who advocated for Hisham's nomination. Abbas is mentioned at least once as a visitor in the caliph's court at Rusafa, where he was welcomed by large crowds, a reflection of the respect in which he was held.

By the time of Hisham's death in 743, Abbas was likely "the most senior figure in the wider Marwānid family", according to the scholar Leone Pecorini Goodall. One report quoted by the 9th-century historian al-Tabari calls him sayyid Bani Marwan ('leader of the Marwanids'). As a son of a slave woman, rather than a free Arab of noble lineage, Abbas, like Maslama, had never been considered for the caliphal succession. Despite his dismissal as its governor, Abbas had continued to reside in the city of Homs, where he commanded the loyalty of at least part of the district's troops.

== Founding of Anjar ==
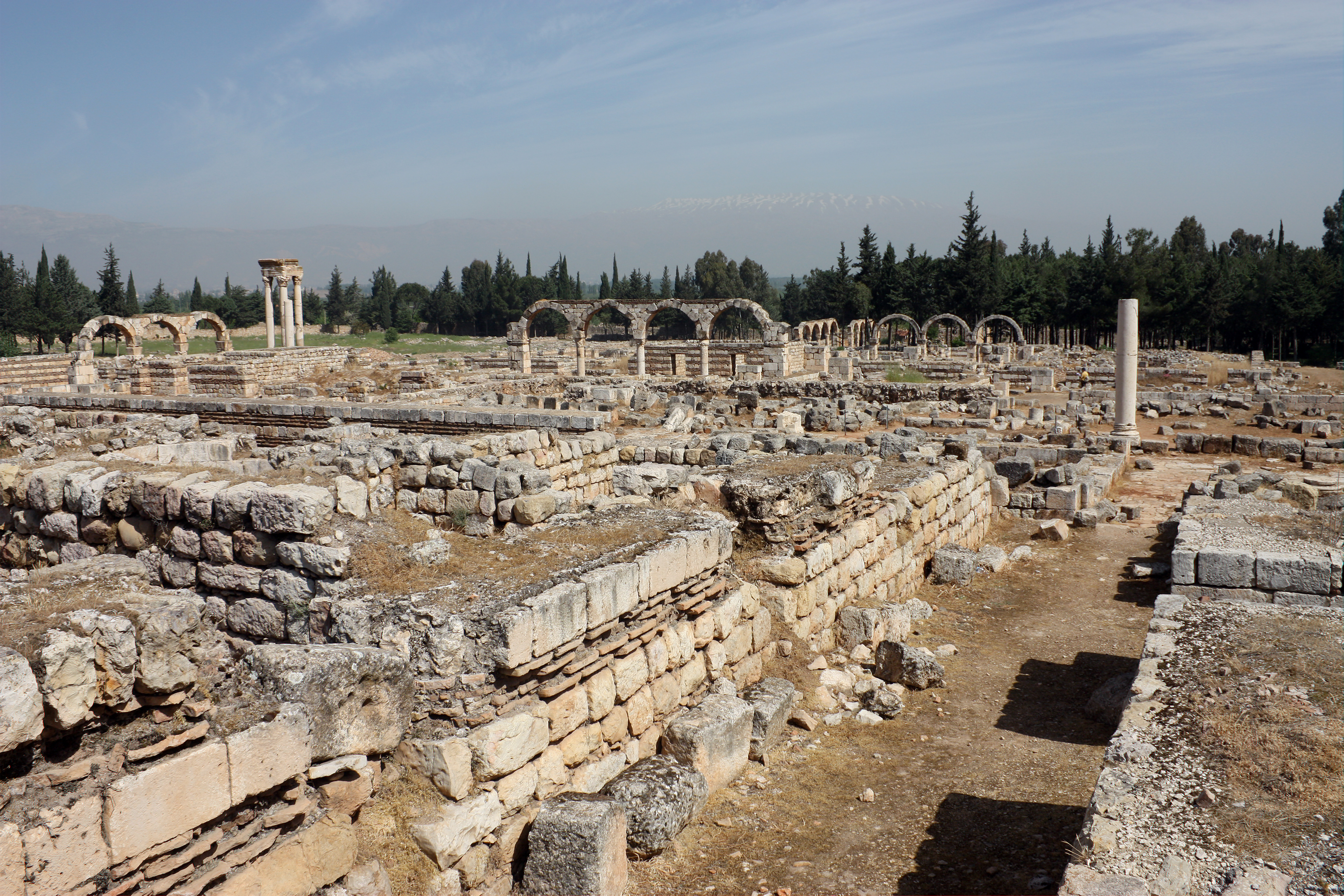
Ruins of the Umayyad palace of Anjar

While the establishment of the madina ("city") of Anjar (originally "Ayn al-Jarr") in the Beqaa Valley is normally attributed to al-Walid I, other sources, including the Byzantine chronicler Theophanes the Confessor and contemporary historian Jere L. Bacharach, credit Abbas for the city's founding in the fall of 714. Greek labourers from Asia Minor, who were likely captured by Abbas during his previous campaigns against the Byzantines, were utilized, in addition to Nestorian quarry workers and Coptic artisans. Bacharach states that construction halted during the winter and resumed in the spring of 715. A Friday mosque and an official residence (dar al-'imara) were built in Anjar. Its proximity to the ancient city of Baalbek made Anjar suitable to become an alternative administrative centre for the strategic Beqaa area, but following the death of al-Walid I in late 715 and Abbas' consequent falling out of favour with the new caliphs, Abbas' patronage of the city ended and further construction came to a permanent halt thereafter.

== Role in the Third Fitna ==
During the reign of his cousin, the unpopular al-Walid II (r. 743–744), Abbas was initially reluctant to oppose the caliph and counselled against provoking a civil war. In the end, however, he participated in the conspiracy and coup that deposed Walid and brought Abbas's brother Yazid III on the throne. Neither Yazid nor his successor Ibrahim lasted long on the throne, which fell to the general Marwan ibn Muhammad (r. 744–750) during the ensuing civil war of the Third Fitna. Marwan had Abbas thrown into prison in Harran, where he died of a disease in 750.

== Descendants ==
Al-Abbas was held by the 10th-century historian Ibn Hazm to have fathered some 30 sons. Among them were al-Harith, who played a political role under Yazid III, and Nasr, who is mentioned as one of the Umayyads who settled in the Umayyad emirate of Muslim Spain established in 756.

== Sources ==
- Bacharach, Jere L. (1996). Gülru Necipoğlu (ed.). "Marwanid Umayyad Building Activities: Speculations on Patronage". Muqarnas: An Annual on the Visual Culture of the Islamic World. 13. Leiden: Brill: 27–44. doi:10.1163/22118993-90000355. ISSN 0732-2992.
- Blankinship, Khalid Yahya (1994). The End of the Jihâd State: The Reign of Hishām ibn ʻAbd al-Malik and the Collapse of the Umayyads. Albany, New York: State University of New York Press. ISBN 978-0-7914-1827-7.
- Crone, Patricia (1980). Slaves on Horses: The Evolution of the Islamic Polity (1980 ed.). Cambridge: Cambridge University Press. ISBN 978-0521229616.
- Goodall, Leone Pecorini (2022). ""The ʿAbbās after Whom Those Who Rule in Baghdad Are Named": Al-ʿAbbās b. al-Walīd in Late Antique Accounts of the Marwānids and the Third Fitna". Al-ʿUṣūr al-Wusṭā. 30. Columbia University: 384–434. doi:10.52214/uw.v30i.8881. hdl:20.500.11820/627d3c33-3c66-40e2-b060-bae27069465a.
- Fowden, Garth (2004). Quṣayr 'Amra: Art and the Umayyad Elite in Late Antique Syria. Berkeley and Los Angeles: University of California Press. ISBN 0-520-23665-3.
- Lilie, Ralph-Johannes; Ludwig, Claudia; Pratsch, Thomas; Zielke, Beate (1999). "al-'Abbas ibn al-Walīd (#5)". Prosopographie der mittelbyzantinischen Zeit: 1. Abteilung (641–867), Band 1: Aaron (# 1) – Georgios (# 2182) (in German). Berlin and Boston: De Gruyter. p. 4. ISBN 978-3-11-015179-4.
- Marsham, Andrew (2022). "Kinship, Dynasty, and the Umayyads". The Historian of Islam at Work: Essays in Honor of Hugh N. Kennedy. Leiden: Brill. pp. 12–45. ISBN 978-90-04-52523-8.
- Scales, Peter C. (1994). The Fall of the Caliphate of Cordoba: Berbers and Arabs in Conflict. Leiden: E. J. Brill. ISBN 90-04-09868-2.
- Uzquiza Bartolomé, Aránzazu (1994). "Otros Linajes Omeyas en al-Andalus". In Marín, Manuela (ed.). Estudios onomástico-biográficos de Al-Andalus: V (in Spanish). Madrid: Consejo Superior de Investigaciones Científicas. pp. 445–462. ISBN 84-00-07415-7.
- Zetterstéen, K. V. & Gabrieli, F. (1960). "al-'Abbās b. al-Walīd". In Gibb, H. A. R.; Kramers, J. H.; Lévi-Provençal, E.; Schacht, J.; Lewis, B. & Pellat, Ch. (eds.). The Encyclopaedia of Islam, Second Edition. Volume I: A–B. Leiden: E. J. Brill. pp. 12–13. OCLC 495469456.
