= Abd al-Aziz ibn al-Walid =

8th century Umayyad prince, general and district governor

Abd al-Aziz ibn al-Walid عبد العزيز بن الوليد
- Died: c. 728/729
- Spouse: Maymuna bint Abd al-Rahman ibn Abdallah ibn Abd al-Rahman ibn Abi Bakr
- Issue: Atiq; Abd al-Malik
- Dynasty: Umayyad
- Father: Al-Walid I
- Mother: Umm al-Banin bint Abd al-Aziz
- Religion: Islam
- Occupation: Governor of Jund Dimashq
- Military career
- Allegiance: Umayyad Caliphate
- Branch: Umayyad army
- Service years: c. 709–720s
- Conflicts: Arab–Byzantine wars

Abd al-Aziz ibn al-Walid (Arabic: عبد العزيز بن الوليد, romanized: ʿAbd al-ʿAzīz ibn al-Walīd; died 728/729) was an Umayyad prince, commander in the wars against the Byzantine Empire, and governor of Damascus during the reign of his father, Caliph al-Walid I (r. 705–715). The most prominent of al-Walid's sons, his father attempted to install him as his successor, but was unsuccessful. After the death of al-Walid's brother, Caliph Sulayman (r. 715–717), Abd al-Aziz made a failed bid for the caliphate, his maternal uncle, Umar ibn Abd al-Aziz (r. 717–720), having succeeded to the office beforehand.

== Birth and background ==
Abd al-Aziz's father was the Umayyad caliph al-Walid I (r. 705–715) and his mother was Umm al-Banin, a daughter of al-Walid's paternal uncle, Abd al-Aziz ibn Marwan. His wife was Maymuna bint Abd al-Rahman ibn Abdallah, the great-granddaughter of Abd al-Rahman ibn Abi Bakr, a prominent early Muslim figure, and great-great-granddaughter of the first Rashidun caliph, Abu Bakr (r. 632–634). He had two sons, Atiq and Abd al-Malik.

Abd al-Aziz was regarded by his father as "the sayyid, the most forceful personality, amongst his sons", according to the historian C. E. Bosworth. Al-Walid appointed him governor of Jund Dimashq (military district of Damascus). In 713, he is reported to have led the Hajj pilgrimage to Mecca, though early sources more commonly credit his uncle Maslama ibn Abd al-Malik with the role that year.

== Commander in the Arab–Byzantine wars ==
Abd al-Aziz led his first campaign against the Byzantines in Asia Minor in 709, when he captured a fortress, although his uncle Maslama ibn Abd al-Malik led the main raid of the year afterwards. In 710 he led the main Umayyad attack, although under the auspices of Maslama as commander-in-chief for the Byzantine front, and in 713 he led an attack against the frontier fortress of Gazelon.

== Attempts at caliphal succession ==
In 714/715, Abd al-Aziz's father attempted to reverse the succession arrangement, by which the throne would pass to his brother Sulayman, in favour of Abd al-Aziz. In addition to various officials and poets in al-Walid's court, Abd al-Aziz gained the support of the powerful viceroy of the eastern half of the Caliphate, al-Hajjaj ibn Yusuf, who died in 714, the governor of Khorasan, Qutayba ibn Muslim, and a prominent Alid of Medina, Zayd, the son of Hasan ibn Ali, who was a father-in-law of al-Walid. The prominent Arabic poet Jarir ibn Atiyah promoted his succession in verse:

To ʿAbd al-ʿAzīz are raised the eyes of the flock, when the shepherds made their choice
His merits call attention to him, when the state's tent pole and the heavens fall.
The possessors of authority from Quraysh said, 'The pledge is incumbent upon us when the race is run,' And they considered ʿAbd al-ʿAzīz to be the successor to (the) covenant; they have not acted wrongfully in that, nor done evil.
Let it slide in its entirety to him, Commander of the Faithful, if you so wish.
For the people have already stretched out their hands and the veil has gone.
And if they were to make the pledge of allegiance to you as successor to (the) covenant, then justice would be established and the building would be in balance.

Despite significant support for Abd al-Aziz, al-Walid was unable to impose his will and Sulayman succeeded him. When Sulayman died in northern Syria in 717, Abd al-Aziz intended to claim the throne in Damascus, but upon learning that his maternal uncle, Umar II had been chosen as caliph, he presented himself before him and acknowledged his rule. According to the account of the historian al-Waqidi (d. 823), during their encounter Umar informed Abd al-Aziz that he would not have disputed his accession, to which Abd al-Aziz replied: "I would not like anyone else but you to have taken over the office".

Abd al-Aziz died in AH 110 (728/729 CE). During the reign of Abd al-Aziz's cousin, Caliph al-Walid II (r. 743–744), there were proposals to nominate Abd al-Aziz's son, Atiq, as the caliph's successor. Al-Walid II nominated his own sons, al-Hakam and Uthman, instead, which led to the intra-Umayyad Third Muslim Civil War.

== Sources ==
- Bosworth, C. E. (1982). Medieval Arabic Culture and Administration. Variorum Reprints. ISBN 0-86078-113-5.
- Crone, Patricia (1980). Slaves on Horses: The Evolution of the Islamic Polity (1980 ed.). Cambridge: Cambridge University Press. ISBN 978-0521229616.
- Hinds, Martin, ed. (1990). The History of al-Ṭabarī, Volume XXIII: The Zenith of the Marwānid House: The Last Years of ʿAbd al-Malik and the Caliphate of al-Walīd, A.D. 700–715/A.H. 81–95. SUNY Series in Near Eastern Studies. Albany, New York: State University of New York Press. ISBN 978-0-88706-721-1.
- Lilie, Ralph-Johannes (1976). Die byzantinische Reaktion auf die Ausbreitung der Araber. Studien zur Strukturwandlung des byzantinischen Staates im 7. und 8. Jhd (in German). Munich: Institut für Byzantinistik und Neugriechische Philologie der Universität München. OCLC 797598069.
- Marsham, Andrew (2009). Rituals of Islamic Monarchy: Accession and Succession in the First Muslim Empire. Edinburgh: Edinburgh University Press. ISBN 978-0-7486-3077-6.
- Marsham, Andrew (2022). "Kinship, Dynasty, and the Umayyads". The Historian of Islam at Work: Essays in Honor of Hugh N. Kennedy. Leiden: Brill. pp. 12–45. ISBN 978-90-04-52523-8.
- Gordon, Matthew S.; Robinson, Chase F.; Rowson, Everett K.; Fishbein, Michael (2018). The Works of Ibn Wāḍiḥ al-Yaʿqūbī (Volume 3): An English Translation. Leiden: Brill. ISBN 978-90-04-35621-4.
- Robinson, Majied (2020). Marriage in the Tribe of Muhammad: A Statistical Study of Early Arabic Genealogical Literature. Berlin: Walter de Gruyter. ISBN 978-3-11-062416-8.
- Scales, Peter C. (1994). The Fall of the Caliphate of Córdoba: Berbers and Andalusis in Conflict. Leiden: Brill.
- Zetterstéen, K.V. (1960). "ʿAbd al-ʿAzīz ibn al-Walīd". In Gibb, H. A. R.; Kramers, J. H.; Lévi-Provençal, E.; Schacht, J.; Lewis, B. & Pellat, Ch. (eds.). The Encyclopaedia of Islam, Second Edition. Volume I: A–B. Leiden: E. J. Brill. p. 58. OCLC 495469456.
