= Siege of Tyana =

Siege of the Arab-Byzantine wars

Coordinates: 37°50′53″N 34°36′40″E

- Part of the Arab–Byzantine wars (Early Muslim conquests)
- Map of the Arab-Byzantine frontier zone
Date	707–708/708–709
Location	Tyana, southeastern Cappadocia (modern-day Kemerhisar, Bor, Niğde, Turkey)
Result	Umayyad victory

Belligerents
Byzantine Empire	Umayyad Caliphate

Commanders and leaders
Theophylact Salibas; Theodore Karteroukas	Maslama ibn Abd al-Malik al-Abbas ibn al-Walid

Casualties and losses
40,000 killed	Unknown
- Entire population of Tyana killed, enslaved or deported

The siege of Tyana was carried out by the Umayyad Caliphate in 707–708 or 708–709 in retaliation for a heavy defeat of an Umayyad army under Maimun the Mardaite by the Byzantine Empire in c. 706. The Arab army invaded Byzantine territory and laid siege to the city in summer 707 or 708. The date is uncertain, as virtually each of the extant Greek, Arabic, and Syriac parallel sources has in this respect a different date. Tyana initially withstood the siege with success, and the Arab army faced great hardship during the ensuing winter and was on the point of abandoning the siege in spring, when a relief army sent by Emperor Justinian II arrived. Quarrels among the Byzantine generals, as well as the inexperience of a large part of their army, contributed to a crushing Umayyad victory. Thereupon the inhabitants of the city were forced to surrender. Despite the agreement of terms, the city was plundered and largely destroyed, and according to Byzantine sources its people were made captive and deported, leaving the city deserted.

== Background ==
In 692/693, the Byzantine emperor Justinian II (r. 685–695, 705–711) and the Umayyad caliph Abd al-Malik (r. 685–705) broke the truce that had existed between Byzantium and the Umayyad Caliphate since 679, following the failed Muslim attack on the Byzantine capital, Constantinople. The Byzantines secured great financial and territorial advantages from the truce, which they extended further by exploiting the Umayyad government's involvement in the Second Muslim Civil War (680–692). However, by 692 the Umayyads were clearly emerging as the victors in the conflict, and Abd al-Malik consciously began a series of provocations to bring about a resumption of warfare. Justinian, confident in his own strength based on his previous successes, responded in kind. Finally, the Umayyads claimed that the Byzantines had broken the treaty and invaded Byzantine territory, defeating the imperial army at the Battle of Sebastopolis in 693. In its aftermath, the Arabs quickly regained control over Armenia and resumed their attacks into the border zone of eastern Asia Minor, that would culminate in the second attempt to conquer Constantinople in 716–718. Furthermore, Justinian was deposed in 695, beginning a twenty-year period of internal instability that almost brought the Byzantine state to its knees.

== Arab campaign against Tyana ==
As part of these Arab raids, an invasion under a certain Maimun al-Gurgunami ("Maimun the Mardaite") took place, which raided Cilicia and was defeated by a Byzantine army under a general named Marianus near Tyana. The dating of this expedition is unclear; although the primary account, by al-Baladhuri, places it under Abd al-Malik (who died in 705), it is commonly dated to 706 by modern scholars. According to Baladhuri, this Maimun had been a slave of Caliph Muawiyah's sister, who had fled to the Mardaites, a group of Christian rebels in northern Syria. After the Mardaites had been subdued, the general Maslama ibn Abd al-Malik, who had heard of his valour, liberated him and entrusted him with a military command, and later swore to avenge his death.

As a result, Maslama launched another attack aimed at Tyana, with his nephew al-Abbas ibn al-Walid as co-commander. The chronology of the expedition is again unclear: the Byzantine chronicler Theophanes the Confessor puts it in A.M. 6201 (708/709 AD, and possibly even 709/710), but Arab sources date it to A.H. 88 and 89 (706/707 AD and 707/708 AD respectively). As a result, the siege has been variously dated to 707–708 AD and 708–709 AD.

The Arabs besieged the city, employing siege engines to bombard its fortifications. They managed to destroy part of the wall, but were unable to enter the city. Despite launching several assaults, the defenders successfully drove them back. The siege continued into winter, and the Arabs began to suffer greatly from shortage of food, so that they began contemplating abandoning the siege altogether. In the spring, however, Justinian II, who had been restored to the Byzantine throne in 705, assembled a relief army under the generals Theodore Karteroukas and Theophylact Salibas and sent it towards Tyana. The Byzantine chroniclers record that the regular troops were complemented by armed peasants, numerous but lacking in any military experience. Modern historians consider this an indication of the dire situation of the regular Byzantine army, partly as a result of Justinian's purge of the officer corps after his restoration, and partly due to the losses suffered in the war with the Bulgars.

As the relief army approached Tyana, it was confronted by the Arabs, and in the ensuing battle, the Byzantines were routed. According to Theophanes, the two Byzantine generals quarrelled among themselves, and their attack was disorderly. The Byzantines lost many thousand dead, and the captives also numbered in the thousands. According to Agapius of Manbij, the Romans were routed and lost 40,000 men. Michael the Syrian and the Chronicle of 1234 likewise report that 40,000 Romans were killed in the battle. The Arabs captured the Byzantine camp and took all the provisions they had brought along for the beleaguered city, allowing them to continue the siege. The inhabitants of Tyana now despaired of any succour, and as their own supplies dwindled they began negotiations for a surrender. The Arabs promised to allow them to depart unharmed, and the city capitulated after a siege of nine months (in March according to Michael the Syrian, in May–June according to al-Tabari). Theophanes reports that the Arabs broke their promise and enslaved the entire population, which was deported to the Caliphate, but no other source confirms this. After looting the town, the Arabs razed it to the ground.

== Aftermath ==
The chroniclers report that after sacking Tyana, Maslama and Abbas divided their forces and campaigned in Byzantine territory. Again the chronology, as well as the identity of the targets, is uncertain. The primary sources give 709 or 710 as the dates, which could mean that these raids happened in the immediate aftermath of Tyana or in the year after. Abbas raided Cilicia and from there turned west as far as Dorylaion, while Maslama seized the fortresses of Kamouliana and Heraclea Cybistra near Tyana, or, according to another interpretation of the Arabic sources, marched also west and took Heraclea Pontica and Nicomedia, while some of his troops raided Chrysopolis across from Constantinople itself. Arab raids continued for the next years, and were carried out even while a huge army under Maslama was besieging Constantinople in 717–718. After the failure of this undertaking, Arab attacks continued, but they were now concerned with plunder and prestige, rather than outright conquest. Although the Umayyad attacks of the early 8th century were successful in gaining control of the border districts of Cilicia and the region around Melitene, and despite their destruction of Byzantine strongholds like Tyana in the following decades, the Arabs were never able to permanently establish a presence west of the Taurus Mountains, which thus came to delineate the Arab-Byzantine frontier for the next two centuries.

== Sources ==
- Brooks, E.W. (1898). "The Arabs in Asia Minor (641–750), from Arabic Sources". The Journal of Hellenic Studies. XVIII. The Society for the Promotion of Hellenic Studies: 182–208.
- Haldon, John F. (1997) [1990]. Byzantium in the Seventh Century: The Transformation of a Culture (2nd ed.). Cambridge: Cambridge University Press. doi:10.1017/CBO9780511582318. ISBN 978-0511582318.
- Howard-Johnston, James (2010). Witness to a World Crisis: Historians and Histories of the Middle East in the Seventh Century. Oxford: Oxford University Press. ISBN 978-0199208593.
- Lilie, Ralph-Johannes (1976). Die byzantinische Reaktion auf die Ausbreitung der Araber. Studien zur Strukturwandlung des byzantinischen Staates im 7. und 8. Jhd (in German). Munich: Institut für Byzantinistik und Neugriechische Philologie der Universität München. OCLC 797598069.
- Mango, Cyril; Scott, Roger (1997). The Chronicle of Theophanes Confessor. Byzantine and Near Eastern History, AD 284–813. Oxford: Oxford University Press. ISBN 0-19-822568-7.
- Stratos, Andreas N. (1980). Byzantium in the Seventh Century, Volume V: Justinian II, Leontius and Tiberius, 685–711. Amsterdam: Adolf M. Hakkert. ISBN 90-256-0852-3.
- Treadgold, Warren (1997). A History of the Byzantine State and Society. Stanford, California: Stanford University Press. ISBN 0-8047-2630-2.
- Hoyland, Robert G. (2011). Theophilus of Edessa's Chronicle and the Circulation of Historical Knowledge in Late Antiquity and Early Islam. Liverpool University Press. p. 201. ISBN 978-1-84631-698-2.
