= Umm al-Banin bint Abd al-Aziz =

Wife of Umayyad caliph al-Walid I

Umm al-Banin bint Abd al-Aziz أم البنين بنت عبد العزيز
- Born: Egypt, Umayyad Caliphate
- Died: 720s Damascus, Bilad al-Sham, Umayyad Caliphate
- Spouse: al-Walid I
- Children: Abd al-Aziz ibn al-Walid; Muhammad ibn al-Walid; Marwan ibn al-Walid; Anbasa ibn al-Walid; A'isha bint al-Walid
- Dynasty: Umayyad
- Father: Abd al-Aziz ibn Marwan
- Mother: Layla bint Suhayl
- Religion: Islam

Umm al-Banin bint Abd al-Aziz (Arabic: أم البنين بنت عبد العزيز) was an Umayyad princess, principal wife of the Umayyad caliph al-Walid I and sister of eight Umayyad caliph Umar ibn Abd al-Aziz.

== Biography ==
Umm al-Banin was the daughter of Umayyad prince and powerful governor of Egypt Abd al-Aziz and his third wife, Layla bint Suhayl.

Her grandfather, Marwan had named Abd al-Aziz his second heir after Abd al-Malik. The latter, however, wanted his son al-Walid I (r. 705–715) to succeed him, and Abd al-Aziz was persuaded not to object to this change. In the event, Abd al-Aziz died on 12 May 705 CE (13 Jumada I AH 86), four months before Abd al-Malik. Abd al-Malik nominated his son as heir shortly after her father's death.

Umm al-Banin married her cousin al-Walid, Historian Marsham notes al-Walid's marriage to his first cousin, Umm al-Banin, "tied the fortunes" of Abd al-Malik and her father, Abd al-Aziz ibn Marwan. From her al-Walid had his sons Abd al-Aziz, Muhammad, Marwan, and Anbasa, and a daughter, A'isha. Her elder son Abd al-Aziz was regarded by his father as "the sayyid, the most forceful personality, amongst his sons", according to the historian C. E. Bosworth.

During this time period, women were not yet completely confined to gender segregated harem seclusion, and the wives of the Caliphs are still known to have been allowed to give audiences to men. Umm al-Banin successfully asked her husband to be able to receive Governor Al-Hajjaj after having been informed of his opinion: "women are just for pleasure, and not to be trusted with a secret or to be consulted about affairs of the state" and his opposition to the Caliph taking political advise from women. She let him wait for a long while before finally admitting him in audience, during which she told him: "the Caliph will not take your opinion about his women seriously. You are the most trivial person living, and this is why god has chosen you to destroy the ka'ba [during the trevolf of Ibn al-Zubayr] and kill the grandson of Calip Abu Bakr", after which she asked her slave woman to dismiss him.

Her husband died 715 and was succeeded by nominated heir Sulayman after her brother-in law Sulayman's death. Her brother became caliph because her brother-in-law nominated her brother as successor on his death bed.

== Sources ==
- Bewley, Aisha (2000). The Men of Madina by Muhammad Ibn Sa'd, Volume 2. Ta-Ha Publishers. ISBN 9781897940907.
- Blankinship, Khalid Yahya (2009). "ʿAbd al-ʿAzīz b. Marwān". In Fleet, Kate; Krämer, Gudrun; Matringe, Denis; Nawas, John; Rowson, Everett (eds.). Encyclopaedia of Islam (3rd ed.). Brill Online. ISSN 1873-9830.
- Bosworth, C. E. (1982). Medieval Arabic Culture and Administration. Variorum Reprints. ISBN 0-86078-113-5.
- El-Azhari, Taef (2019). Queens, Eunuchs, and Concubines in Islamic History, 661-1257. Edinburgh: Edinburgh University Press. ISBN 978-1-4744-2319-9.
- Marsham, Andrew (2022). "Kinship, Dynasty, and the Umayyads". In Osti, Letizia; van Berkel, Maaike (eds.). The Historian of Islam at Work: Essays in Honor of Hugh N. Kennedy. Leiden: Brill. pp. 12–45. ISBN 978-90-04-52523-8.
- Zetterstéen, K.V. (1960). "ʿAbd al-ʿAzīz b. Marwān". In Gibb, H. A. R.; Kramers, J. H.; Lévi-Provençal, E.; Schacht, J.; Lewis, B. & Pellat, Ch. (eds.). The Encyclopaedia of Islam, Second Edition. Volume I: A–B. Leiden: E. J. Brill. OCLC 495469456.
