= Abd al-Aziz ibn Marwan =

Umayyad prince and Governor of Egypt (died 705)

Abd al-Aziz ibn Marwan عَبْدُ الْعَزِيزِ بْنُ مَرْوَانَ

Governor of Egypt
- In office 685–705
- Preceded by: Abd al-Rahman ibn Utba
- Succeeded by: Abd Allah ibn Abd al-Malik

Personal details
- Died: 12 May 705 Hulwan
- Spouses: Umm Asim bint Asim ibn Umar; Umm Abd Allah bint Abd Allah ibn Amr ibn al-As; Layla bint Suhayl; Hafsa bint Asma bint Abd al-Rahman ibn al-Harith; Maria (concubine)
- Children: Al-Asbagh; Umar; Asim; Abu Bakr; Muhammad; Sahl; Suhayl; Zabban; Juzayy; Sahla (daughter); Umm al-Hakam (daughter); Umm al-Banin (daughter)
- Parents: Marwan I (father); Layla bint Zabban ibn al-Asbagh al-Kalbiyya (mother)
- Relatives: Abd al-Malik (brother); Al-Walid I (nephew and son-in-law)
- Religion: Islam

Military service
- Allegiance: Umayyad Caliphate
- Years of service: 684–685
- Battles/wars: Second Fitna; Battle of Marj Rahit (684)

Abd al-Aziz ibn Marwan ibn al-Hakam (Arabic: عَبْدِ الْعَزِيز بْنِ مَرْوَان بْنِ الْحَكَم, romanized: ʿAbd al-ʿAzīz ibn Marwān ibn al-Ḥakam; died 12 May 705) was the Umayyad governor and de facto viceroy of Egypt between 685 and his death. He was appointed by his father, Caliph Marwan I (r. 684–685). Abd al-Aziz's reign was marked by stability and prosperity, partly due to his close relations and reliance on the Arab military settlers of Fustat. Under his direction and supervision, an army led by Musa ibn Nusayr completed the Muslim conquest of North Africa. He was removed from the line of succession to the caliphal throne and, in any case, died before his brother, Caliph Abd al-Malik (r. 685–705). However, one of Abd al-Aziz's sons, Umar, would become caliph in 717.

== Early life and career ==
Abd al-Aziz was the son of a prominent Umayyad statesman, Marwan ibn al-Hakam, and one of his wives, Layla bint Zabban ibn al-Asbagh of the Banu Kalb tribe. Abd al-Aziz may have visited Egypt when the province was governed by Maslama ibn Mukhallad (667–682), the appointee of Mu'awiya I, founder of the Umayyad Caliphate. In 682, Abd al-Aziz was part of an embassy, alongside his elder half-brother Abd al-Malik, sent by Marwan to the anti-Umayyad rebel Abd Allah ibn al-Zubayr in Mecca. When the people of Medina, home to the Umayyad family, rebelled against Mu'awiya's successor, Caliph Yazid I (r. 680–683), and besieged the Umayyads in 683, Abd al-Aziz is not mentioned as being present. The historian Wilhelm Barthold speculates he could have been in Egypt at the time.

Ibn al-Zubayr declared himself and gained wide recognition as caliph after the death of Yazid in 683. In the summer of 684, when Marwan was elected caliph by pro-Umayyad loyalist tribes in Syria, chief among them the Banu Kalb, Abd al-Aziz was in his father's company. He fought alongside his father and the Banu Kalb against the supporters of Ibn al-Zubayr in Syria, al-Dahhak ibn Qays al-Fihri and the Qays tribes, at the subsequent Battle of Marj Rahit near Damascus in August. Abd al-Aziz was thrown off his horse during the battle, which ended in a crushing Umayyad–Kalbite victory. Afterward, he played a leading role in Marwan's conquest of Egypt from its Zubayrid governor Ibn Jahdam, serving as the commander of a contingent which crossed into the province through the Sinai Peninsula, via the Red Sea port town of Ayla. There, he confronted Ibn Jahdam and his deputy Zuhayr ibn Qays, with the latter later defecting to Abd al-Aziz. After Marwan returned to Syria, he designated Abd al-Malik as his successor, to be followed by Abd al-Aziz. Abd al-Malik acceded as caliph upon Marwan's death in April 685.

== Governor of Egypt ==
Abd al-Aziz is most notable for his twenty-year-long tenure as governor (āmīr) of Egypt, from 685 CE (AH 65) until his death in 705 CE (AH 86). He was placed in the post by Marwan after Marwan departed Egypt for Syria in February 685. He enjoyed wide autonomy in the governance of Egypt, and functioned as a de facto viceroy of the country. Abd al-Aziz also supervised the completion of the Muslim conquest of North Africa; he appointed Musa ibn Nusayr to his post as governor of Ifriqiya.

=== Foundation of Hulwan and building works in Fustat ===
During the early years of his reign, Abd al-Aziz resided chiefly at Fustat, leaving it only for two visits to the Caliph's court at Damascus and four visits to Alexandria. Fustat was the capital of the province, established in the 640s by the Arab conqueror and first governor of Islamic Egypt, Amr ibn al-As. Abd al-Aziz was a major patron of architectural projects and his rule marked the heyday of Umayyad-era building works in the city. Several houses, palaces, roofed markets and fountains were built under his direction.

Abd al-Aziz completely rebuilt and expanded the Amr ibn al-As Mosque, Fustat's congregational mosque. To its west, in 686/87 he erected the Dar al-Mudhahabba (the Gilded Palace). The residential complex was also known in the contemporary Arabic sources as al-Madina (the city), giving an indication of its size, covering up to 4–5 hectares (9.9–12.4 acres) including gardens. The complex included some buildings of at least two storeys. It overlooked the Nile and likely included the house and surrounding land of the high-ranking official Kharija ibn Hudhafa (d. 661), which Marwan had purchased from Kharija's son for 10,000 gold dinars.

According to the historian Wladyslaw Kubiak, the Dar al-Bayda (the White Palace) built by Marwan in Fustat may have been viewed by Abd al-Aziz as unsuitable for a person of his rank and the new palace became the official residence of Egypt's Marwanids (descendants of Caliph Marwan). He built a bath in the city named after his son Zabban, upon whom it was bestowed. The bath became the subject of a celebrated verse:

Whoever has in his soul a place for white, let him have that white in the Bath of Zabban
It has no breath, no eyelashes, however, it is an idol in the creation of man.

At least four roofed markets, each specialising in a type of merchandise, were built during Abd al-Aziz's reign. In August/September 688, he also built the Qantara bridge over the Khalij Amir al-Mu'minin (Canal of the Commander of the Faithful), which passed through Fustat and connected Heliopolis (Ayn Shams) to the Nile. The bridge, located in the Hamra al-Quswa neighborhood, was likely meant to serve a major circulatory road in Fustat and its remains were still visible in the 12th century. It was one of a number of bridges constructed in the city by Abd al-Aziz.

When the plague struck Fustat in 689 or 690, Abd al-Aziz moved his residence and seat of government about 20 kilometers (12 mi) south of the city and founded Hulwan. According to the 15th-century Egyptian historian al-Maqrizi, Abd al-Aziz had relocated due to flooding in Fustat in 690 and chose the site of Hulwan for his new capital because its elevation, 35 metres (115 ft) above the banks of the Nile, was higher than the river's flood line. The foundation of Hulwan began a custom of establishing "satellite residence town[s]", which was "repeated countless times by later rulers in various regions of the Islamic world", according to Kubiak.

Abd al-Aziz constructed in Hulwan a mosque, a number of churches (see below) and palaces, and planted vineyards and palm trees. He erected a nilometer in the new city, although it was replaced by the nilometer built on the Nile river island of al-Rawda in 715. Hulwan was well known for the glass pavilions patronised by the governor and an artificial lake fed by an aqueduct. The city's prosperity under Abd al-Aziz was praised by the poet Ubayd Allah ibn Qays al-Ruqayyat.

=== Domestic affairs ===
Abd al-Aziz proved to be a capable governor, and his rule was a period of peace and prosperity, marked by his conciliatory and co-operative attitude towards the leaders of the local Arab settlers (the jund). Throughout his tenure, Abd al-Aziz relied on them rather than the Syrians, who elsewhere were the main pillar of the Umayyad regime.

Abd al-Aziz was known for his generosity. The 10th-century Egyptian historian al-Kindi quotes a report that he arranged for one thousand bowls of food to be set up around his palace and had another one hundred bowls supplied to the tribal settlers of Fustat, both on a daily basis. These bowls are also mentioned in a well-known eulogy by Ibn Qays al-Ruqayyat:

That is Laylā's son, Abd al-'Azīz: at Bābilyūn [Babylon Fortress]
his food bowls are full to overflowing.

According to al-Kindi, Abd al-Aziz introduced an Islamic ritual in Egypt consisting of a sitting held in the mosques during afternoon prayers on the ninth day of Dhu al-Hijjah, the Day of Arafa. Abd al-Aziz opposed a higher tax burden on indigenous Muslim converts. He had been called on by Abd al-Malik to follow the example of the caliph's governor of Iraq and the eastern Caliphate, al-Hajjaj ibn Yusuf, who imposed the poll tax (jizya) on the inhabitants of his province even after their conversion to Islam. Instead, Abd al-Aziz took the advice of the qadi (chief Islamic judge) and treasurer of Egypt, Abd al-Rahman ibn Hubayra, and did not implement the measure.

The medieval Egyptian historian Ibn Abd al-Hakam (d. 971) relates that Abd al-Aziz had a different copy of the Qur'an produced from the version of al-Hajjaj, which had been sent to him. The revised version was said to have contained grammatical corrections and was inherited, in succession, by Abd al-Aziz's son Abu Bakr, and then Abd al-Aziz's daughter Asma and son al-Hakam. The Baghdad-based writer Abu Ubayd Allah al-Marzubani (d. 995) praised Abd al-Aziz for promoting the Arabic language. Having caused misunderstandings by his own erroneous pronunciation of Arabic, Abd al-Aziz endeavoured to learn the correct pronunciation and later made gifts to his petitioners dependent on their mastery of the Arabic language.

==== Relations with Christians ====
According to the 10th-century Melkite Christian patriarch Eutychius of Alexandria, Abd al-Aziz permitted his Melkite servants to establish a small church in Hulwan dedicated to Saint George. One of the governor's Jacobite secretaries, Athanasios, was also allowed to construct a church in close proximity to the Babylon Fortress (Qasr al-Sham) in the vicinity of Fustat.

Apart from personal favours to the Christians in his circle, Abd al-Aziz pursued a restrictive policy towards Egypt's indigenous Christian population. In 693/94, on one of his visits to Alexandria, he arrested the Christian leaders of the city and dispersed them across the country's villages and rural districts. He then obliged each district to pay taxes according to the yield of its fields and gardens. Abd al-Aziz had his son al-Asbagh take a census of all the monks of the province, imposed on each of them a poll tax—from which they had previously been exempted—of one gold dinar, and forbade the recruitment of new monks. He also closely monitored the elections of the Coptic patriarchs and obliged the patriarchs to take their seat in Hulwan. The public display of Christian symbols was banned, and a Christian source reports that Abd al-Aziz had all the crosses in Egypt destroyed.

=== Death and legacy ===
Marwan had named Abd al-Aziz his second heir after Abd al-Malik. The latter, however, wanted his son al-Walid I (r. 705–715) to succeed him, and Abd al-Aziz was persuaded not to object to this change. In the event, Abd al-Aziz died on 12 May 705 CE (13 Jumada I AH 86), four months before Abd al-Malik. Abd al-Aziz was succeeded as governor by Abd al-Malik's son Abd Allah, whose aim was to restore the caliphate's control over the province and, in the words of the historian Hugh N. Kennedy, "remove all traces of Abd al-Aziz's administration".

By dint of his major architectural works in Fustat and Hulwan, roughly coinciding with the period of monumental Islamic architecture's earliest stages under the caliphs Abd al-Malik and al-Walid I, Kubiak calls Abd al-Aziz perhaps "the true father of Islamic architecture". His patronage activities initiated a trend continued by later governors and caliphs. Though he spent large sums in the course of his rule, Abd al-Aziz's personal lifestyle was austere. At his death, he left the relatively small fortune of 7,000 gold dinars (according to his treasurer) and tattered clothing. In an indication of his piety, he stated on his deathbed his wish to have been a mere cameleer roaming the Hejaz (western Arabia), a man of no consequence or a collection of dust.

== Family and descendants ==
According to the historian Ibn Sa'd (d. 845), Abd al-Aziz had children from three wives and two slave women. He married Umm Asim bint Asim, a granddaughter of Caliph Umar (r. 634–644), while they were both residing in Damascus in c. 684–685. Abd al-Aziz highly valued this marital link with the family of the former caliph and spent 400 gold dinars for the wedding. While Ibn Sa'd counts four sons from Umm Asim—Asim, Umar, Abu Bakr and Muhammad—al-Baladhuri and Ibn Abd al-Hakam count two: Abu Bakr Asim and Umar II. Twelve years after Abd al-Aziz's death, Umar was appointed caliph and ruled until 720. From another wife, Umm Abd Allah bint Abd Allah, a granddaughter of Amr ibn al-As, Abd al-Aziz had his sons Suhayl and Sahl and daughters Sahla and Umm al-Hakam. From a third wife, Layla bint Suhayl, he had his daughter Umm al-Banin. Abd al-Aziz was also married to Hafsa, a daughter of Asma bint Abd al-Rahman ibn al-Harith of the prominent Qurayshite clan of Banu Makhzum.

Five of his children, including his eldest son al-Asbagh, were born to slave women. According to al-Kindi (d. 961), Abd al-Aziz appointed al-Asbagh as a temporary governor of Alexandria and, during Abd al-Aziz's visit to Syria in 695, as his place-holder over the whole of Egypt. Abd al-Aziz intended that al-Asbagh—for whom he nurtured hopes in the caliphal succession—would succeed him as governor of Egypt, making the province into a hereditary appendage for his household, but al-Asbagh died a few months before Abd al-Aziz. Other sons of Abd al-Aziz from his slave women included Zabban and Juzayy. The latter was one of the first Umayyads to relocate to al-Andalus (the Iberian Peninsula, where an Umayyad emirate was established in 756) in the aftermath of the Abbasid Revolution in 750, moving soon after the fall of the last Umayyad caliph, Marwan II (r. 744–750). Juzayy died in 757 and left several descendants in Cordoba. Descendants of Zabban established themselves in Niebla and one of them developed the Suwayqat al-Zabbaniyyin square in Cordoba. Ibn Abd al-Hakam notes a third slave woman, of Greek or Coptic origin, named Maria, with whom Abd al-Aziz had a son named Muhammad. In honour of Maria, Abd al-Aziz built a palace in Fustat called Qasr Mariya (Maria's Palace).

In the aftermath of the Abbasid Revolution, Abd al-Aziz's grandsons Marwan ibn al-Asbagh, Abd al-Malik ibn Abi Bakr and al-Asbagh ibn Zabban were killed in the massacre of the Umayyad family at Nahr Abi Futrus in Palestine in late June 750. His grandsons Asim and Umar (both sons of Abu Bakr) and Asim's sons Maslama, Aban and Abd al-Malik took refuge with Coptic villagers in Upper Egypt and were granted aman by the Abbasid governor Salih ibn Ali, who took office in August–September 750, and subsequently returned to Fustat. On orders from Caliph al-Saffah (r. 750–754), the pardoned group were sent to Qalansuwa in Palestine, along with Abd al-Aziz's grandson Umar ibn Suhayl, who had been arrested with his sons at Jabal Ulaq, and great-grandson Isa ibn al-Walid ibn Umar (and four other descendants of Umar II), where they were all executed.

Surviving descendants of Abd al-Aziz remained influential in Egyptian affairs through the early Abbasid period. Abd al-Aziz's grandsons Muhammad and Amr, both sons of Sahl, are mentioned several times in the traditional Islamic sources, and Amr was counted among the supporters of the Alid rebel Abd Allah ibn Mu'awiya when the latter fled Merv for Egypt in 747. A great-grandson of Abd al-Aziz, al-Asbagh ibn Sufyan ibn Asim, supported the Abbasid caliph al-Mansur (r. 754–775) in Egypt, and another great-grandson, Dihya ibn Mus'ab ibn al-Asbagh, led a revolt in the country against Caliph al-Hadi (r. 785–786).

Descendants of Abd al-Aziz ibn Marwan

Marwan I (r. 684–685)
Abd al-Aziz
al-Asbagh	Umm al-Banin	Asim	Umar II (r. 717–720)	Muhammad	Umm al-Hakam	Abu Bakr	Sahla	Sahl	Juzayy	Suhayl	Zabban
Marwan al-Ashall	Mus'ab	Zayd	Abd al-Aziz	Abdallah	al-Walid	10 others	Asim	Umar	Abd al-Malik	Amr	Muhammad	Umar	Muhammad
Dihya	Adam	Isa	Sufyan	Maslama	Aban	Abd al-Malik
al-Asbagh

Marwanid caliph

== Bibliography ==
=== Primary sources ===
- Bewley, Aisha (2000). The Men of Madina by Muhammad Ibn Sa'd, Volume 2. Ta-Ha Publishers. ISBN 9781897940907.
- Eutychius of Alexandria (1909). Cheikho, L.; Carra de Vaux, B. (eds.). Annales. Vol. VIII. Beirut: CSCO, Scriptores Arabici.
- Fishbein, Michael, ed. (1990). The History of al-Ṭabarī, Volume XXI: The Victory of the Marwānids, A.D. 685–693/A.H. 66–73. SUNY Series in Near Eastern Studies. Albany, New York: State University of New York Press. ISBN 978-0-7914-0221-4.
- Muhammad ibn Yusuf al-Kindi (1912). Guest, Rhuvon (ed.). Kitāb al-Wulāt wa-Kitāb al-Quḍāt. Leiden: Brill.
- Hawting, G. R., ed. (1989). The History of al-Ṭabarī, Volume XX: The Collapse of Sufyānid Authority and the Coming of the Marwānids: The Caliphates of Muʿāwiyah II and Marwān I and the Beginning of the Caliphate of ʿAbd al-Malik, A.D. 683–685/A.H. 64–66. SUNY Series in Near Eastern Studies. Albany, New York: State University of New York Press. ISBN 978-0-88706-855-3.
- Hinds, Martin, ed. (1990). The History of al-Ṭabarī, Volume XXIII: The Zenith of the Marwānid House: The Last Years of ʿAbd al-Malik and the Caliphate of al-Walīd, A.D. 700–715/A.H. 81–95. SUNY Series in Near Eastern Studies. Albany, New York: State University of New York Press. ISBN 978-0-88706-721-1.
- McAuliffe, Jane Dammen, ed. (1995). The History of al-Ṭabarī, Volume XXVIII: The ʿAbbāsid Authority Affirmed: The Early Years of al-Mansūr, A.D. 753–763/A.H. 136–145. SUNY Series in Near Eastern Studies. Albany, New York: State University of New York Press. ISBN 978-0-7914-1895-6.
- Muhammad ibn Sa'd (1904–1940). Sachau, E. (ed.). Kitāb aṭ-Ṭabaqāt al-kabīr. Vol. 5. Leiden.
- Ibn Abd al-Hakam (1922). Torrey, Charles C. (ed.). Kitāb Futūḥ Miṣr wa-aḫbāruhā. New Haven.

=== Secondary sources ===
- Ahmed, Asad (2007). "Prosopography and the Reconstruction of Hijazi History for the Early Islamic Period: The Case of the Awfid Family". In Keats-Rohan, K. S. B. (ed.). Prosopography Approaches and Applications: A Handbook. Oxford: Prosoprograpica et Genealogica. pp. 415–458. ISBN 978-1-900934-12-1.
- Ahmed, Asad Q. (2010). The Religious Elite of the Early Islamic Ḥijāz: Five Prosopographical Case Studies. University of Oxford Linacre College Unit for Prosopographical Research. ISBN 9781900934138.
- Barthold, W. W. (1971). "Caliph Umar II and Conflicting Reports on his Personality". Islamic Quarterly. 15. Translated by Jan W. Weryho: 69–104.
- Becker, Carl Heinrich (1902). Beiträge zur Geschichte Ägyptens unter dem Islam (in German). Straßburg: Trübner.
- Blankinship, Khalid Yahya (2009). "ʿAbd al-ʿAzīz b. Marwān". In Fleet, Kate; Krämer, Gudrun; Matringe, Denis; Nawas, John; Rowson, Everett (eds.). Encyclopaedia of Islam (3rd ed.). Brill Online. ISSN 1873-9830.
- Bosworth, C.E. (1991). "Marwān I b. al-Ḥakam". In Bosworth, C. E.; van Donzel, E. & Pellat, Ch. (eds.). The Encyclopaedia of Islam, Second Edition. Volume VI: Mahk–Mid. Leiden: E. J. Brill. pp. 621–623. ISBN 978-90-04-08112-3.
- Caetani, Leone (1923). Cronografia generale del bacino mediterraneo e dell'Oriente musulmano dal 622 al 1517 dell'era volgare : ossia dal principio dell'era musulmana alla caduta dell'Egitto in potere dei Turchi ottomani (in Italian). Rome: Accad. dei Lincei.
- Delgado, Jorge Lirola (1993). El poder naval de Al-Andalus en la época del califato omeya. Granada: Servicio de Publicaciones de la Universidad de Granada. ISBN 84-338-1797-3.
- Dennett, Daniel C. Jr. (1950). Conversion and the Poll Tax in Early Islam. Cambridge: Harvard University Press.
- Hilloowala, Yasmin (1998). The History of the Conquest of Egypt, being a Partial Translation of Ibn 'Abd al-Hakam's Futuh Misr and an Analysis of this Translation (PDF) (Thesis). The University of Arizona.
- Jones, J. M. B. (1971). "Hulwān". In Lewis, B.; Ménage, V. L.; Pellat, Ch. & Schacht, J. (eds.). The Encyclopaedia of Islam, Second Edition. Volume III: H–Iram. Leiden: E. J. Brill. p. 572. OCLC 495469525.
- Kennedy, Hugh (1998). "Egypt as a province in the Islamic caliphate, 641–868". In Petry, Carl F. (ed.). The Cambridge History of Egypt: Islamic Egypt, 640–1517. Vol. 1. Cambridge: Cambridge University Press. pp. 62–85. ISBN 0-521-47137-0.
- Khoury, R. G. (2002). "Zuhayr b. Kays". In Bearman, P. J.; Bianquis, Th.; Bosworth, C. E.; van Donzel, E. & Heinrichs, W. P. (eds.). The Encyclopaedia of Islam, Second Edition. Volume XI: W–Z. Leiden: E. J. Brill. p. 559. ISBN 978-90-04-12756-2.
- Kubiak, Wladyslaw B. (1987). Al-Fustat: Its Foundation and Early Urban Development. Cairo: The American University in Cairo Press. ISBN 978-1-61797-741-1.
- Mayer, L. A. (1952). "As-Sinnabra". Israel Exploration Journal. 2 (3): 183–187. JSTOR 27924483.
- Robinson, Chase F. (2005). Abd al-Malik. London: Oneworld Publications. ISBN 978-1-85168-361-1.
- Robinson, Chase F. (2010). "The Violence of the Abbasid Revolution". In Suleiman, Yasir (ed.). Living Islamic History: Studies in Honour of Professor Carole Hillenbrand. Edinburgh: Edinburgh University Press. pp. 226–251. ISBN 978-0-7486-3738-6.
- Sábada, Elías Terés (1957). "Linajes árabes en al-Andalus". Al-Andalus (in Spanish). 22 (1): 55–112. ISSN 0304-4335.
- Sijpesteijn, Petra M. (October 2014). "An Early Umayyad Papyrus Invitation for the Ḥajj". Journal of Near Eastern Studies. 73 (2): 179–190. doi:10.1086/677240. hdl:1887/85169. JSTOR 10.1086/677240. S2CID 162233422.
- Uzquiza Bartolomé, Aránzazu (1992). "La Familia Omeya en al-Andalus". In Marín, Manuela; Jesús, Zanón (eds.). Estudios onomástico-biográficos de Al-Andalus: V (in Spanish). Madrid: Consejo Superior de Investigaciones Científicas. pp. 373–432. ISBN 84-00-07265-0.
- Zetterstéen, K.V. (1960). "ʿAbd al-ʿAzīz b. Marwān". In Gibb, H. A. R.; Kramers, J. H.; Lévi-Provençal, E.; Schacht, J.; Lewis, B. & Pellat, Ch. (eds.). The Encyclopaedia of Islam, Second Edition. Volume I: A–B. Leiden: E. J. Brill. OCLC 495469456.

Preceded by Abd al-Rahman ibn Utba al-Fihri	Governor of Egypt; 685–705	Succeeded by Abdallah ibn Abd al-Malik
