= Umayyad army =

Military forces of the Umayyad Caliphate

- جند بني أمية
- Active: 661–750
- Allegiance: Umayyad Caliphate
- Type: Land force
- Size: c. 175,000 on the Syrian military register, of whom c. 145,000 belonged to the Damascus jund
- Provincial Headquarters (Amsar): Damascus; Homs; Qinnasrin; Wasit; Harran
- Engagements: Arab–Byzantine wars; Conquest of Transoxiana; Conquest of the Maghreb; Conquest of Hispania; Conquest of Sindh

Commanders
- Commander-in-chief: Caliph
- Selected commanders: Mu'awiya I; Abd al-Malik ibn Marwan; al-Hajjaj ibn Yusuf; Maslama ibn Abd al-Malik; Qutayba ibn Muslim

The Umayyad army was the military of the Umayyad Caliphate from 661 to 750. It was the successor to the land and naval forces of the Rashidun Caliphate. Originating from conquest-era provincial forces it developed into a socio-military system based on the Syrian ajnad, regular payments from the Divan, Arab tribal groups, garrison towns, annual raids and provincial military districts.

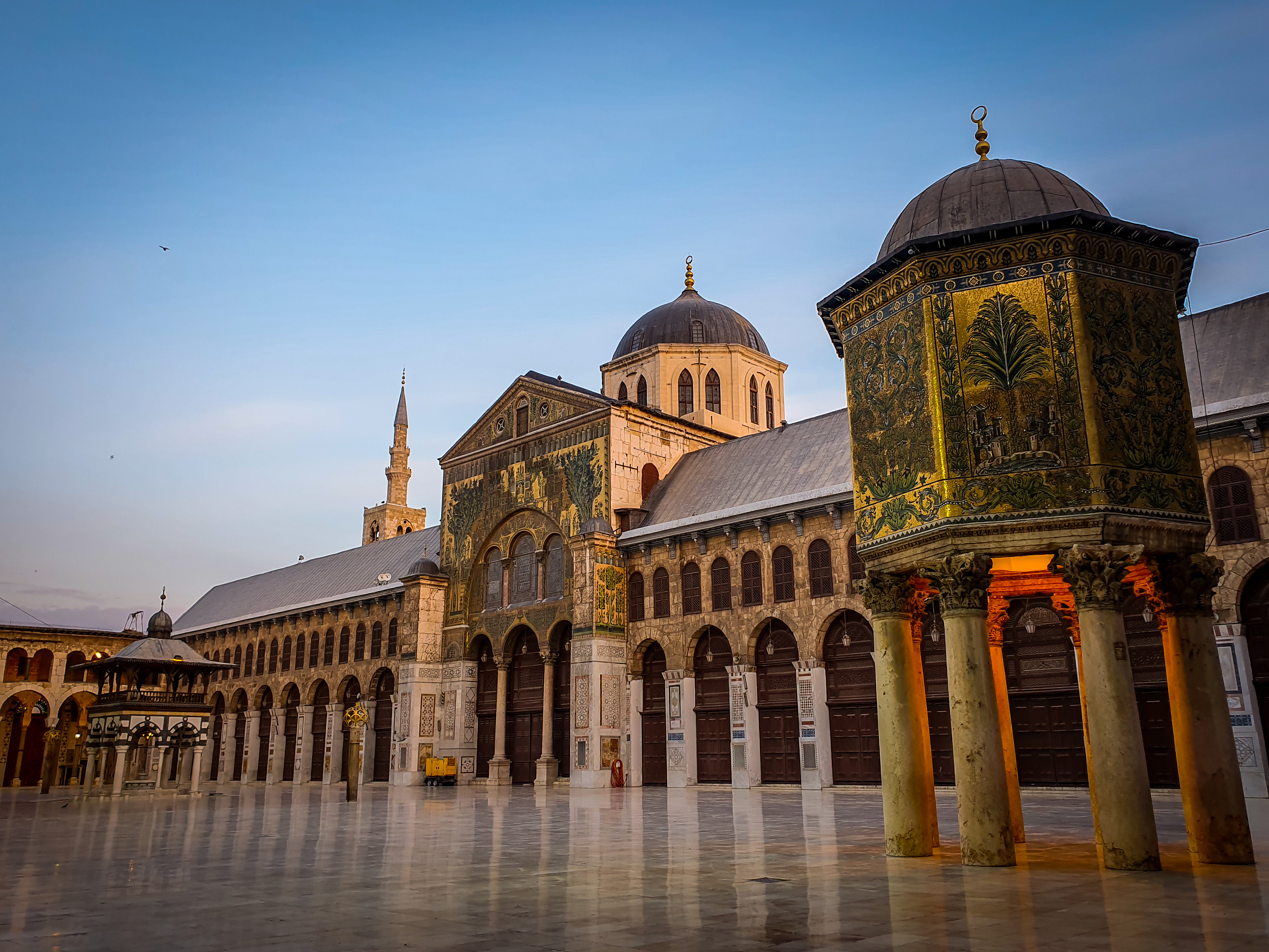
The Umayyad Mosque in Damascus. Damascus was the political center of the Umayyad Caliphate and its Syrian military order.

Under Caliph Mu'awiya (r. 661–680), the core of the army was the Syrian military districts known as Ahl al-Sham. These troops were organised through the ajnad of Damascus, Hims, Palestine, Jordan, and Qinnasrin. By the reign of al-Walid I, the Damascus jund alone is reported to have about 45,000 names. Blankinship estimates that the total Syrian rolls may have contained about 175,000 names, apart from the forces of the Jazira. Its main strengths were regular payment of salaries, Syrian tribal cohesion, liberal recruitment policies, and constant experience in warfare. Its main tensions came from stipend disputes, Syrian-Iraqi regional rivalry, status of the mawali, and the growth of Qays–Yaman tribal factionalism.

Under the Umayyads, the Caliphate extended from the Atlantic and al-Andalus to Transoxiana and Sindh, with Syria as its metropole. For eastern campaigns, Iraq became the main base and Khorasan was the decisive northeastern frontier. The westward expansion was led from Ifriqiya, with its center at Qayrawan. Egypt supplied vital tax revenues, grain and naval manpower. With the reigns of Hisham ibn Abd al-Malik and Marwan II, the combined pressure from several overstretched frontiers, depletion of Syrian military manpower, provincial rebellions, and the rise of the Hashimiyya movement in Khurasan, broke the old military order. Finally, at the Battle of the Zab in 750, Marwan II's Syro-Jazirian army was destroyed by the Khorasani forces of the Abbasids.

== History ==
=== Background ===
The Umayyads inherited the conquest forces of the early caliphate. Their armies used a formation consisting of the center, wings, vanguard, rear guard, cavalry, infantry and standard-bearers. Command usually went to men trusted by the state, with Umayyad power centered in Syria. The Syrian Arabs included old settled and semi-settled groups, especially Kalb, Quda'a and other Yaman-linked tribes. They lived among established towns and villages, served on the Byzantine frontier, and formed the core military base of the Umayyad Caliphate.

Iraq had a different tribal balance. Kufa and Basra drew many soldiers from Najd and eastern Arabia, including Tamim, Bakr, Rabi`ah and other Mudar-linked groups. In Kufa, early soldiers and leading families were later joined by rawādif and new arrivals. By the reign of Caliph Uthman, these groups were said to be changing the social balance of the city and reducing the control of the older military elite. As governor of Syria, Mu'awiya was instructed to settle Bedouins away from cities and villages on vacant lands. Groups such as Tamim, Qays and Asad were settled in the Jazira near Raqqa and other frontier areas.

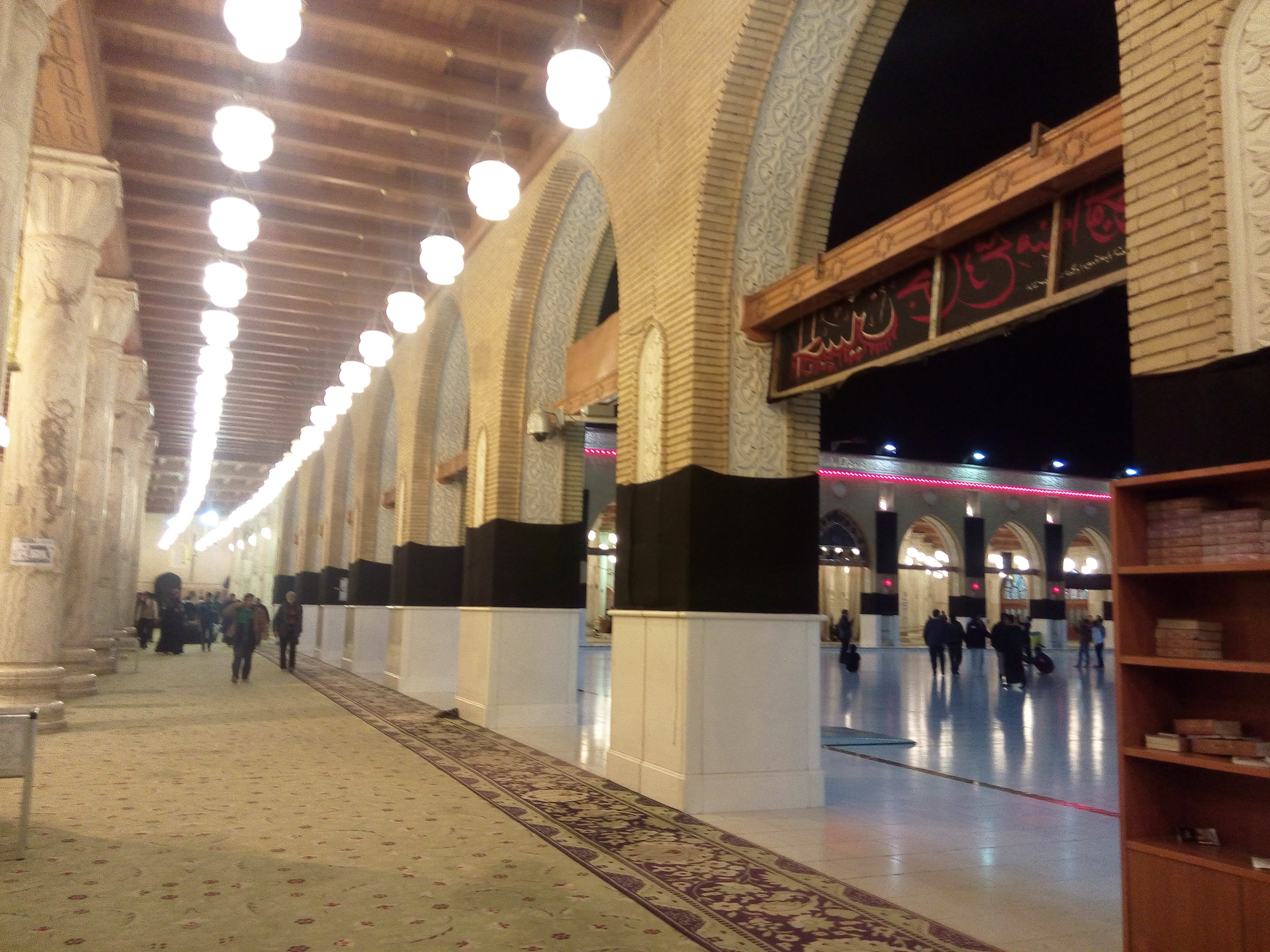
The Great Mosque of Kufa. Kufa was a garrison town where early soldiers, later arrivals and tribal leaders competed for pay, rank and influence.

The conquest state also created a register for military salaries. Soldiers in the dīwān received ʿaṭāʾ, graded by service and other priorities such as tribal affiliation and seniority. Early converts and veterans received higher payments, while later arrivals entered lower categories. Taxes from conquered lands financed the garrison soldiers. Local specialists and allies also served in the army. Persian Asawira, Christian Arabs, Copts, Armenians, Berbers, Slavs, Samaritans and others served as soldiers, diplomats, sailors, guides, spies, couriers, workmen and auxiliaries.

=== Establishment ===
During his governorship of Syria which spanned two decades, Mu'awiya launched naval campaigns and annual summer raids against Byzantium. Syrian military support allowed him to challenge Caliph Ali and his Iraqi followers. At the Battle of Siffin in 657, Mu'awiya's Syrian army fought Ali's Iraqi forces; Muslim tradition reports that the Syrians appealed for Quranic arbitration and weakened Ali's political position. After Ali's death, Mu'awiya entered Kufa in 661 and secured his recognition as caliph.

==== Syrian Arabs ====
The Syrian army had a distinct social base. In Iraq, Arab soldiers lived mainly in new garrison towns such as Kufa and Basra. In Syria, many Arab groups lived among older towns, villages, estates and tribal districts inherited from Byzantine rule. This gave the Syrian army a more provincial and urban and dynastic character, tied to local society, village revenue and the northern war frontier.

The early Umayyads relied especially on the Kalb-led Quda'a confederation. These tribes belonged to the older Arab population of Syria and had long lived under Byzantine rule. This Syrian base differed from the later Qays, Mudar, Tamim and Asad tribal elements, whose main recruitment zones lay farther east in central and eastern Arabia, Iraq and the Jazira. After the conquests, settlement, pay and land turned these tribal names into military factions.

==== Syrian ajnad ====
The Umayyads preserved a loyal Syrian military base. Syria was divided into ajnad, or military districts: Damascus, Hims, Palestine and Jordan. Qinnasrin was added around 680 as northern warfare against Byzantium grew more important. Each jund defended its region, supplied soldiers, collected taxes, and used local revenue to maintain them.

Syrian troops became the core military base of the Umayyad Caliphate. They fought on the frontiers, and formed a reliable standing army for the central government. Their loyalty helped the Umayyads defeat their Iraqi rivals time and again, and later Syrian troops served as garrisons in difficult provinces.

==== Provincial armies ====
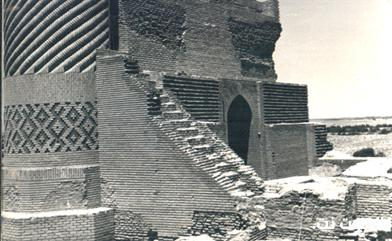
Ruins associated with Wasit, the garrison founded by al-Hajjaj ibn Yusuf between Kufa and Basra.

The Syrian army stood beside strong provincial armies. In the early Sufyanid period, governors relied on local tribal soldiers, a small shurṭa, and tribal leaders known as ashrāf. These leaders connected governors with tribesmen and shaped mobilisation, discipline and pay.

Iraq was the main base for eastern conquests. Kufa and Basra supplied armies for Umayyad advances in Khorasan, Sistan, Sindh and Transoxiana. Kufa was organised into sevenths, later quarters under Ziyad ibn Abihi, while Basra was divided into fifths. These were urban, tribal and military divisions.

Iraqi soldiers claimed land revenue as a tribal right. Under the governorship of al-Hajjaj ibn Yusuf, Syrian troops entered Iraq to restore discipline and suppress revolts. The foundation of Wasit marked the establishment of a Syrian military base in Iraq.

==== Frontier and naval forces ====
The Umayyad frontiers were a series of active war zones. The Jazira grew important because it guarded the northern frontier and supplied many Arab recruits. Its districts, including Diyar Mudar, Diyar Rabi'a and Diyar Bakr, reflected strong tribal divisions. War with Byzantium gave Jaziran troops prestige, and they later became the main power base for Marwan II.

The Umayyads also built a Mediterranean fleet. As governor of Syria, Mu'awiya built naval units which occupied Rhodes and Crete. Egypt supplied sailors, arsenals and shipyards, while major bases included coastal cities such Tyre, Acre, Beirut and Alexandria. Many sailors were Christians, especially Egyptian Copts, who served for wages and provisions.

=== Marwanid consolidation ===
The Marwanid period brought the strongest consolidation of Umayyad military power. During al-Hajjaj's rule in Iraq, he restored discipline among the soldiers of Kufa and Basra in 75/694, who had resisted further campaigns against the Kharijites. He established Wasit as the base for a centralised Syrian garrison in Iraq, and relied on commanders such as al-Muhallab ibn Abi Sufra, who fought the Azariqa under Qatari ibn al-Fuja'a.

The same pressure also produced revolts. The revolt of Abd Allah ibn al-Jarud in 76/695 centered on pay and military service. The larger revolt of Ibn al-Ash'ath in 700–701 began during a campaign in Sistan and Zabulistan, when Iraqi troops opposed distance from home, harsh conditions and al-Hajjaj's authority. The rebels were defeated by al-Hajjaj's Syrian troops at the Battle of Dayr al-Jamajim. Their defeat confirmed Syrian-backed Umayyad control over Iraq.

=== Expansion and deployment ===
The caliphate around 740, near the height of Umayyad military expansion.

The Marwanid army pursued expansion on several fronts. In the east, Qutayba ibn Muslim campaigned in Transoxiana, while Muhammad ibn al-Qasim conquered Sindh. In the west, the governors stationed at Qayrawan completed the conquest of North Africa. In 711, Tariq ibn Ziyad and Musa ibn Nusayr crossed into Iberia with about 15,000 men, mostly Berbers under Arab command. The northern frontier also remained active. Under Maslama ibn Abd al-Malik, the Umayyads launched a second siege of Constantinople. Under Hisham ibn Abd al-Malik, raids continued until the massive defeat at the Battle of Akroinon in 740.

=== Late Umayyad crisis ===
Blankinship describes the early caliphate as a "jihad state" whose power depended on repeated campaigning and mass mobilisation. During the reign of Hisham ibn Abd al-Malik, this system became overextended. The caliphate fought across the Byzantine frontier, Caucasus, Transoxiana, Sijistan, Sindh, North Africa, al-Andalus and the Frankish frontier. Each front required money, horses, commanders, garrisons and replacements. Repeated defeats strained the treasury and trusted Syrian forces.

The depletion of Syrian manpower became the centre of the crisis. The Umayyads still used troops from Iraq, Khurasan, the Jazira, Ifriqiya and al-Andalus, but the old Syrian army remained the dynasty's main reserve. When Syrian units were killed, scattered or sent far from Syria, the caliphate lost the force that usually held the provinces together. The Berber Revolt was especially damaging. In 741, a Syrian force under Kulthum ibn Iyad al-Qushayri was destroyed in North Africa.

Blankinship argues that this scattered the last major Syrian Yamani force. Casualties against the Türgesh in Transoxiana and the defeat at the Battle of Akroinon in 740 also resulted in significant losses. In response, Marwan II shifted the core of the army to the Jaziran forces. He had fought the Byzantines and Khazars, governed the Jazira, and relied mainly on Jaziran Qaysi frontier troops. After becoming caliph, he moved his court to Harran, a Qaysi centre. By then, the Syrian army had split into hostile Qaysi and Kalbi blocs.

In Khurasan, the Hashimiyya used civilian discontent and army factionalism. Abu Muslim raised a revolt near Merv. Qahtaba ibn Shabib al-Ta'i led Abbasid armies west through Rayy, Hamadan, Nihawand and Kufa. The decisive battle came at the Great Zab in January 750. Marwan II advanced from Harran with his Syrian and Jaziran forces. The Abbasid army under Abd Allah ibn Ali used Khurasani infantry and a spear-wall formation. Marwan's army was defeated, and the Umayyad Caliphate collapsed.

== Units ==
=== Syrian ajnad ===
The Syrian ajnad were the main formations of the Umayyad army. Each jund drew pay, recruits and supplies from its district. The principal districts were Damascus, Hims, Palestine, Jordan and Qinnasrin. They linked soldiers, taxation, local elites and the caliph in Damascus. Damascus formed the political centre, while Hims and Qinnasrin guarded the northern frontier.

=== Provincial soldiers ===
The provincial muqātila were enrolled fighting men in the Diwan. They received fiscal Ata payments and served through tribal, urban and provincial groups. In Iraq, the soldiers of Kufa and Basra claimed local revenue as a conquest right. In Khurasan, Iraqi settlers carried tribal divisions eastward, and the same army later became the base of the Abbasid takeover.

=== Police and guards ===
The shurṭa was the police and security force of governors. It enforced order, guarded officials, made arrests and supported political control. The ḥaras was the personal guard of caliphs and commanders. It gave rulers a loyal body of armed men for processions, prayers, private meetings and palace security.

=== Auxiliaries and local troops ===
The Umayyad army also used client, local and allied troops. The Asawira were Iranian cavalrymen from the former Sasanian military class and could receive high stipends. Persian infantry, mawālī, Christian Arabs, Copts, Armenians, Berbers, Slavs, Samaritans and Mardaites served as soldiers, sailors, guides, spies, couriers, labourers and frontier auxiliaries. Treaties could require local communities to provide transport, intelligence, supplies or border service.

=== Naval forces ===
The Umayyad navy operated from Syria, Egypt and the Mediterranean ports. Egypt supplied shipyards, arsenals, sailors and provisions. Coptic sailors served as rowers, helmsmen and crewmen, often as part of Egypt's fiscal obligations. The fleet supported raids, island campaigns and attacks on Constantinople.

== Recruitment and service ==
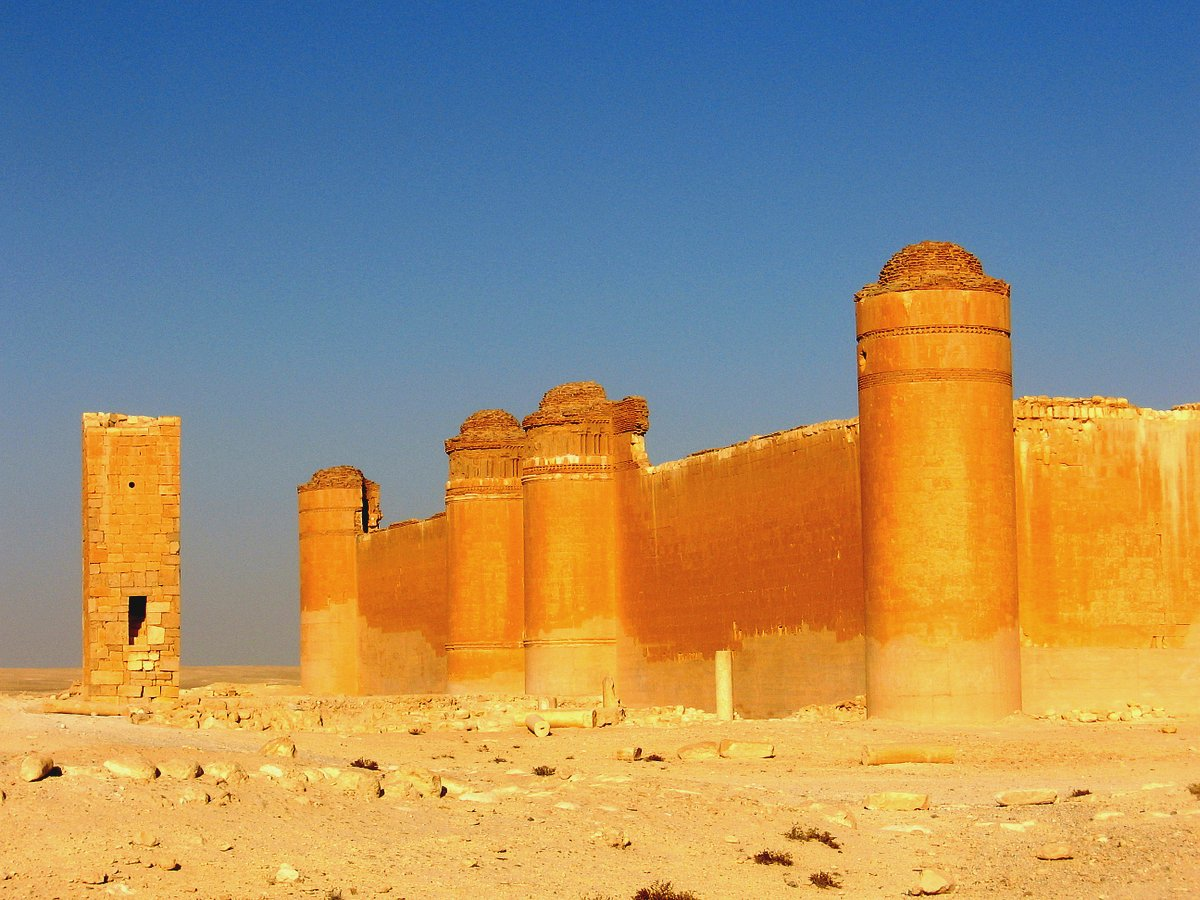
Qasr al-Hayr al-Sharqi, an Umayyad desert complex in Syria.

Recruitment was organised mainly through Arab tribal groups. Tribal identity shaped residence, pay, mobilisation, command and discipline. Units could follow clans, larger tribes or government-made divisions built from tribal blocks. The Syrian army drew heavily on Arab groups long settled in the Levant, especially Kalb and Quda'a. Central and eastern Arabian tribes, including Tamim, Asad, Qays and Mudar, were also important in Iraq, the Jazira and Khurasan.

== Pay and supply ==
The Umayyad army depended on payment in cash, provisions and market supply. The key institution was the Divan, a list of soldiers entitled to revenue and later a military register, or dīwān al-jund. Soldiers in the amṣār received service pay from taxation and conquered land revenue. Pay varied by status, province and precedence. Early veterans received higher stipends than later arrivals. Iraq used silver dirhams, while Syria and Egypt used gold dinars. The Asawira and some other Iranian soldiers could receive pay close to Arab soldiers.

== Equipment ==
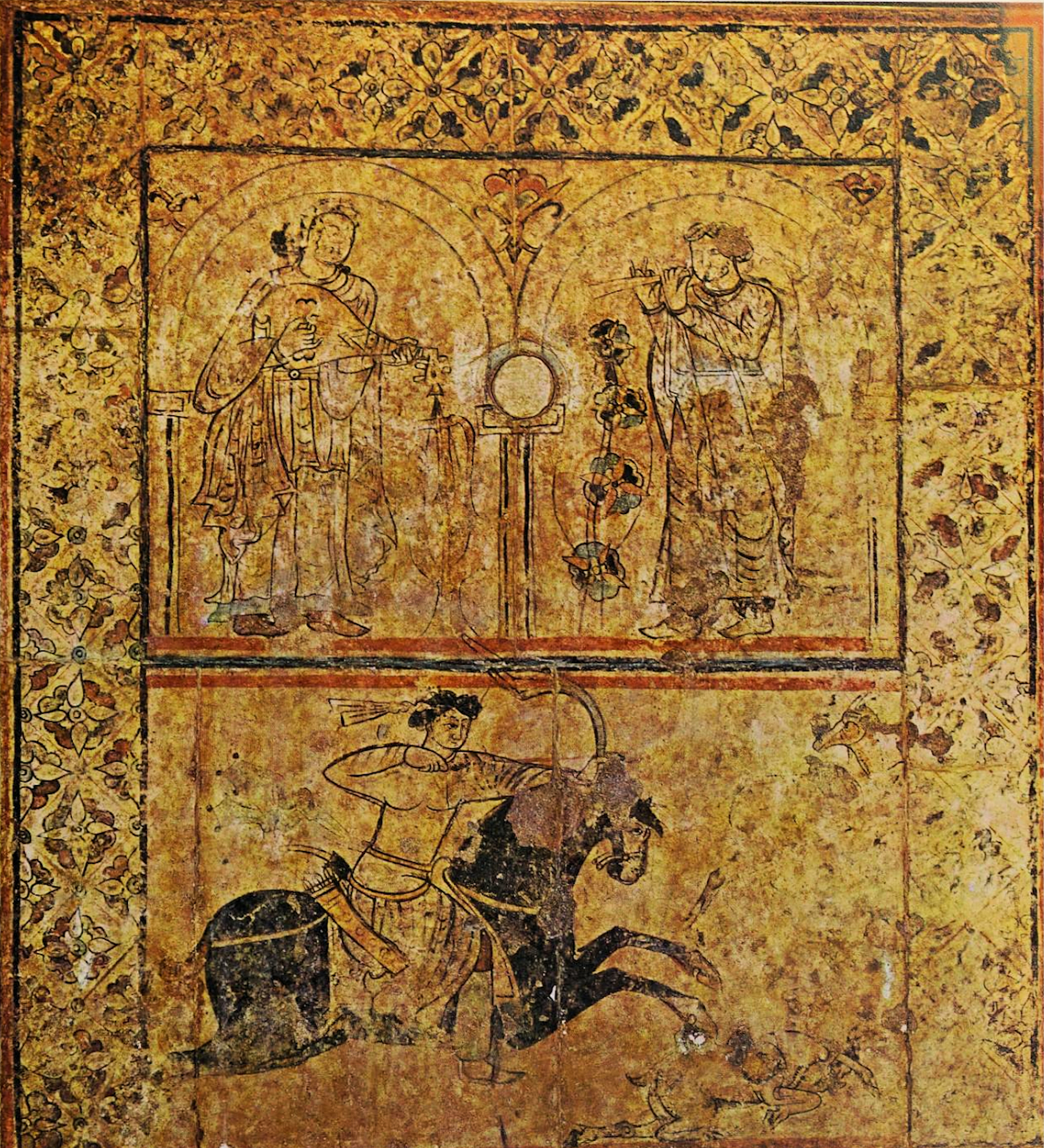
Umayyad fresco from Qasr al-Hayr al-Gharbi, showing a mounted hunter. Palace art gives visual evidence for elite dress, weapons and mounted culture.

Umayyad equipment came from the mixed military world of the early caliphate. It used Arab, Byzantine, Sasanian, Central Asian and local traditions. The infantry used spears and swords, while the cavalry used lances and bows. Armour included mail, helmets, shields, padded clothing and sometimes scale or lamellar protection.

Early Arab armies were often infantry-heavy. Archers and spear-armed cavalry worked together. Nicolle notes that early Islamic archery was often infantry-based and differed from later Turkish-style horse archery. Umayyad art from Qasr al-Hayr al-Gharbi, Qusayr Amra and Khirbat al-Mafjar shows mounted figures, archers, spears, belts, scabbards, helmets and elite dress. At the Battle of the Zab, Khurasani infantry used a spear-wall against the Syrian frontal charge.

== Strategy and tactics ==
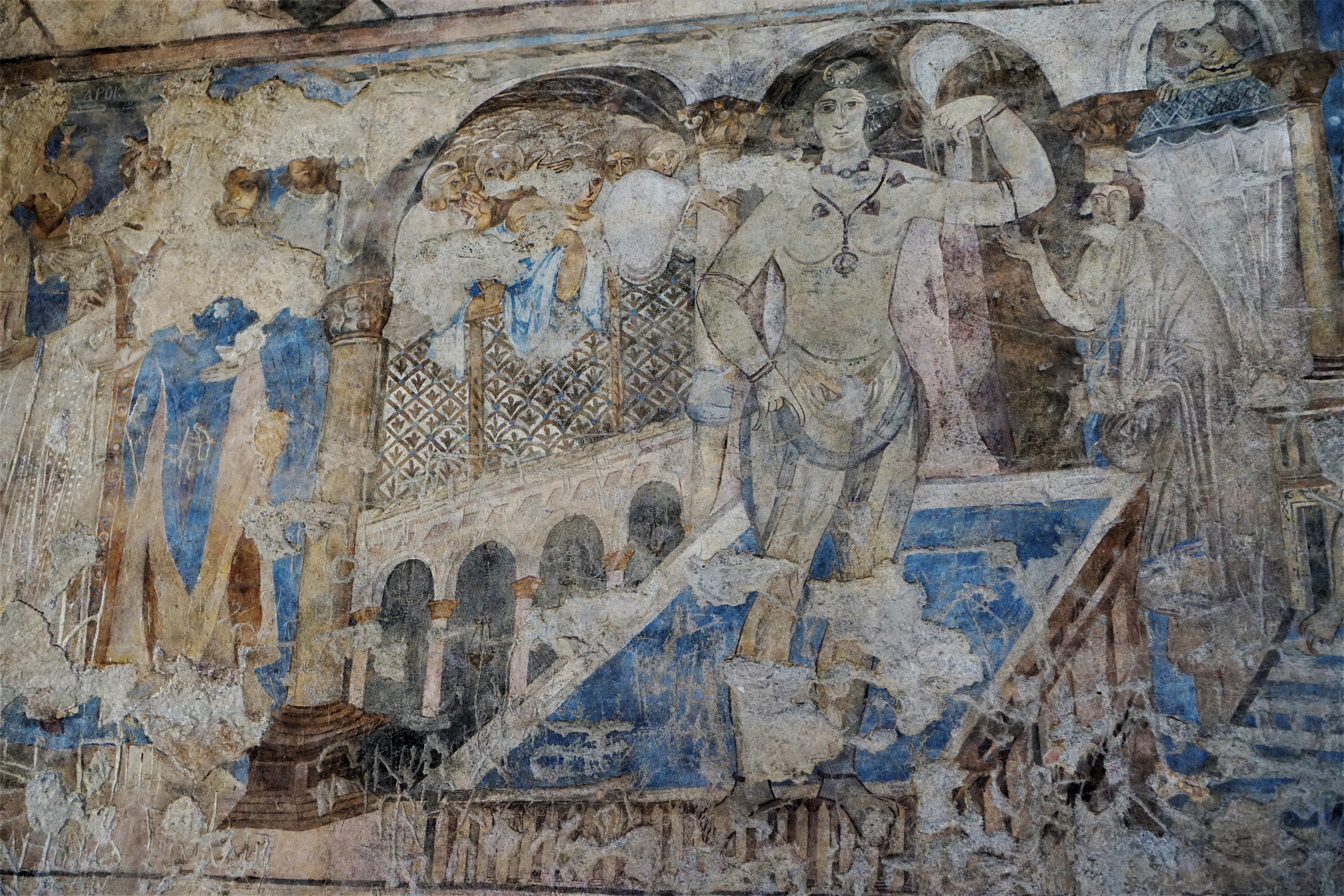
Fresco from Qusayr Amra, Umayyad elite life.

On the Byzantine frontier, the army used annual raids, fortified routes, mountain passes and major expeditions. In North Africa and al-Andalus, it relied heavily on Berber troops. In Transoxiana and the Caucasus, it fought mobile Türgesh and Khazar opponents.

The army also enforced Umayyad rule inside the caliphate. In 683, Yazid I sent a Syrian army under Muslim ibn Uqba to the Hejaz, where it defeated the Medinans at the Battle of al-Harra and besieged Mecca. In 692, Syrian troops under al-Hajjaj ibn Yusuf besieged Mecca again.

== Legacy ==
The Umayyad army shaped the military and political institutions of the early Islamic empire. It preserved the conquest-era system of garrison soldiers, stipends and tribal organisation, and under the Marwanids it was transformed into a more regular service army. The Abbasids inherited much of this military-fiscal system, especially the salaried Divan, but shifted the centre of power from the Syrian army to the Khurasani army. The Umayyad downfall was thus a transfer of military power from Syria to Khurasan.

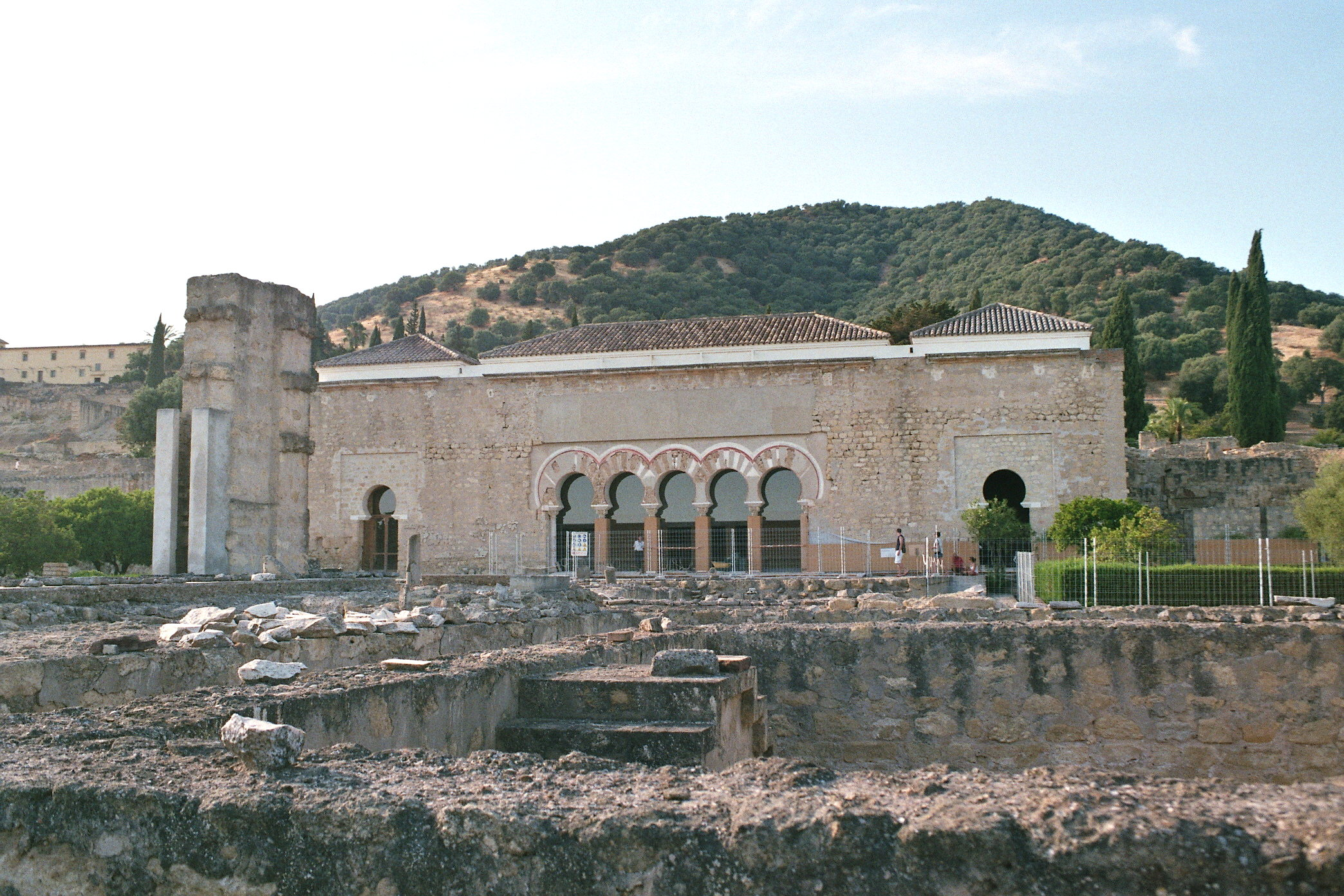
Madinat al-Zahra, the palace-city founded by Abd al-Rahman III.

The Umayyad military tradition continued in al-Andalus, where Abd al-Rahman I founded the Emirate of Córdoba. There, the Umayyads inherited soldiers from the Arab jund groups, Berber forces, local converts, clients and frontier settlers. Under the Caliphate of Córdoba, rulers such as Abd al-Rahman III and al-Hakam II developed a larger court army that included Andalusi Arabs, Muladí, Berbers, Saqaliba and paid troops. The Umayyad army defended the frontier with the Christian kingdoms, and internal revolts.

== See also ==
- Umayyad Caliphate
- Early Muslim conquests
- Jund Dimashq
- Jund Hims
- Jund Filastin
- Jund al-Urdunn
- Jund Qinnasrin
- Anjar
- Abbasid Revolution
- Battle of the Zab
- Qays–Yaman rivalry
- Arab–Byzantine wars
- Arab-Khazar wars
- Berber Revolt

== Bibliography ==
- Al-Qadi, Wadad (2016). "Non-Muslims in the Muslim Conquest Army in Early Islam". In Sijpesteijn, Petra M.; Cobb, Paul M. (eds.). Christians and Others in the Umayyad State. Late Antique and Medieval Islamic Near East. Vol. 1. Oriental Institute of the University of Chicago. pp. 83–127. ISBN 9781614910312.
- Blankinship, Khalid Yahya (1994). The End of the Jihad State: The Reign of Hisham ibn Abd al-Malik and the Collapse of the Umayyads. SUNY Series in Medieval Middle East History. Albany: State University of New York Press. ISBN 0-7914-1827-8.
- Donner, Fred M. (1981). The Early Islamic Conquests. Princeton: Princeton University Press. ISBN 9780691053271.
- Hawting, Gerald R. (2000). The First Dynasty of Islam: The Umayyad Caliphate AD 661–750 (2nd ed.). London and New York: Routledge. ISBN 0-415-24072-7.
- Kennedy, Hugh N. (2001). The Armies of the Caliphs: Military and Society in the Early Islamic State. Warfare and History. London and New York: Routledge. ISBN 0-415-25092-7.
- Nicolle, David (2009). The Great Islamic Conquests AD 632–750. Essential Histories. Vol. 71. Oxford: Osprey Publishing. ISBN 9781846032738.
- Sijpesteijn, Petra M. (2022). "Closing Ranks: Discipline and Loyalty in the Umayyad Army". Al-ʿUṣūr al-Wusṭā. 30: 469–499. doi:10.52214/uw.v30i.9935. hdl:1887/3589819.
