= Early Muslim conquests =

Expansion of the Islamic state (622–750)

- Part of the spread of Islam
- Expansion under Muhammad, 622–632 Expansion under the Rashidun caliphs, 632–661 Expansion under the Umayyad dynasty, 661–750
Date	622–750 CE
Location	Middle East and North Africa; Central Asia; South Asia; Southern Europe
Result	Muslim victory
Territorial changes	Caliphate established from Sind in modern day Pakistan to Hispania in modern day Spain

Belligerents
First Islamic state; Rashidun Caliphate; Umayyad Caliphate	In the Middle East and North Africa: Sasanian Empire; Byzantine Empire; Kingdom of Makuria; Khazar Khaganate; In Central Asia: Western Turkic Khaganate; Turgesh Khaganate; Tang dynasty; Second Turkic Khaganate; In South Asia: Chach dynasty; Karkota dynasty; In Europe: Visigothic Kingdom; Kingdom of Asturias; Frankish Kingdom

The early Muslim conquests, or the early Islamic conquests (Arabic: الْفُتُوحَاتُ الإسْلَامِيَّة, romanized: al-Futūḥāt al-ʾIslāmiyya), also known as the Arab conquests, were a series of wars initiated by the Islamic prophet Muhammad, and continued by the early Muslims. In 622, he established the first Islamic state in Medina, with Muslim armies expanding rapidly out of Arabia under the succeeding Rashidun Caliphate and then the Umayyad Caliphate, culminating in Muslim rule being established throughout most of the Middle East and North Africa, parts of South Asia and Central Asia, and parts of Southern Europe over the following century. According to the Scottish historian James Buchan: "In speed and extent, the first Arab conquests were matched only by those of Alexander the Great, and they were more lasting." At the height of the expansion, Muslim-ruled territory under the Caliphates is estimated to have covered 13,000,000 square kilometres (5,000,000 sq mi), stretching from the Indian subcontinent (at Sind) in the east to the Iberian Peninsula (up to Septimania) in the west.

Among other socio-political changes, the early Muslim conquests caused a rupture in the status quo dominated by the Sasanian Empire in the east and the Byzantine Empire in the west; Muslim armies overran the Sasanians and confined the Byzantines, who were left with part of Anatolia and Southeastern Europe. Detailed explanations for the success of the Muslim campaigns have been difficult to discover, largely because only fragmentary sources have survived from the period. American scholar Fred Donner suggests that Muhammad's establishment of the first Islamic state coupled with ideological coherence and mobilization constituted the main factor that propelled his community to successfully establish one of the largest empires in history. Most historians also agree that, as another primary factor that favoured the Muslim war effort, the Sasanians and the Byzantines were rendered militarily and economically exhausted from decades of warfare against each other, with the Sasanian civil war of 628–632 further accelerating political collapse.

It is also believed that Jews and some Christians in both Sasanian and Byzantine territory may have been dissatisfied with the state of the two empires and either welcomed or were indifferent to the invading Muslim troops. However, Arab Christian confederations such as the Ghassanids initially allied themselves with the Byzantines. There were also instances of working alliances being established between the Sasanians and the Byzantines in spite of their prior hostilities, such as when they combined forces against the Rashidun army during the Battle of Firaz in 633/634. A significant portion of the lands that the Byzantines lost to Muslim offensives in Syria and in Egypt had been taken back from Sasanian occupation just a few years earlier.

== Background ==
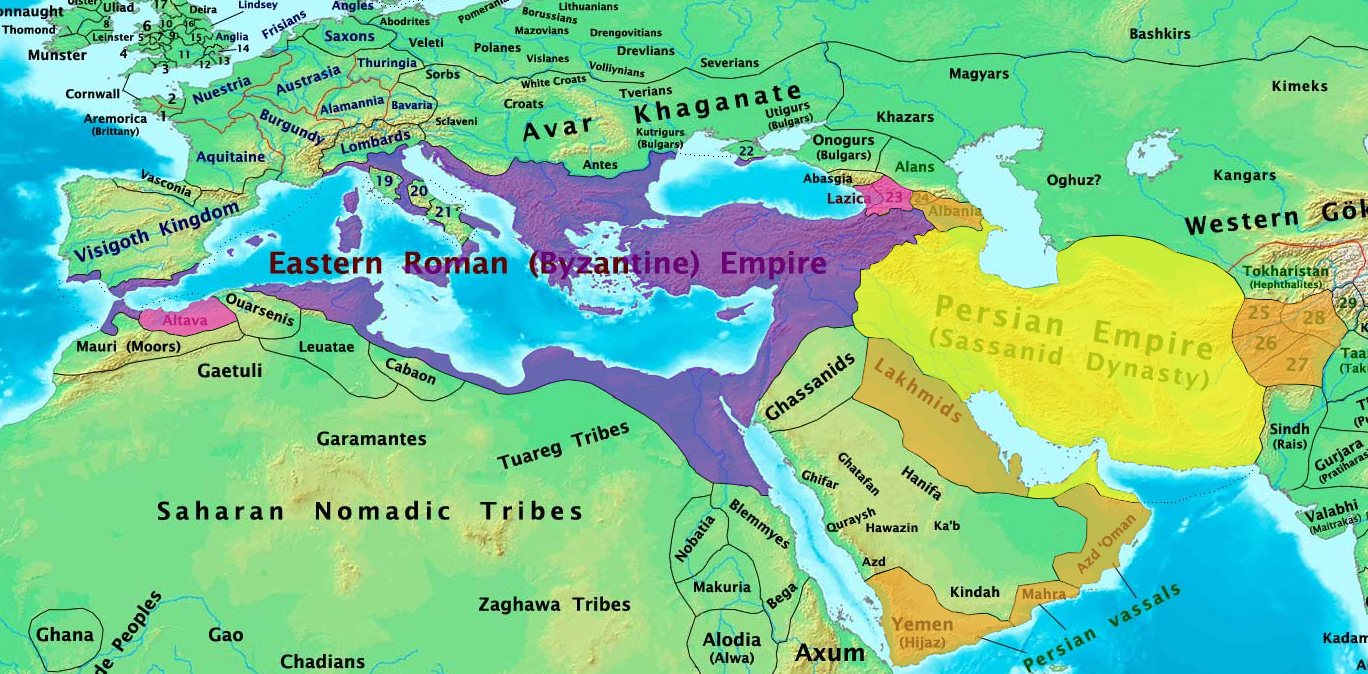
Byzantine and Sasanian Empires in 600 AD

=== Pre-Islamic Arabia ===
Arabia was a region that hosted several cultures, some urban and others nomadic Bedouin. Arabian society was divided along tribal and clan lines, with the most important divisions being between the "southern" and "northern" tribal associations. Both the Byzantine and Sasanian empires competed for influence in Arabia by sponsoring clients; in turn, Arabian tribes sought the patronage of the two rival empires to bolster their own ambitions. The Lakhmid kingdom, which covered parts of what is now southern Iraq and northern Saudi Arabia was a client of Persia, and in 602 the Persians deposed the Lakhmids to take over the defense of the southern frontier. This left the Persians exposed and overextended, helping to set the stage for the collapse of the Persian Empire later that century.

Southern Arabia had, for thousands of years, been a wealthy region at the center of an international trading network, prominently including the spice trade, linking Eurasia, Africa, Europe, the Middle East, India and even from as far away as China. In turn, the Yemeni were skilled sailors, travelling up the Red Sea to Egypt and across the Indian Ocean to India and down the east African coast. Inland, the valleys of Yemen had been cultivated by a system of irrigation that had been set back when the Marib Dam was destroyed by an earthquake in about 450 AD. Frankincense and myrrh had been greatly valued in the Mediterranean region, being used in religious ceremonies. However, the conversion of the Mediterranean world to Christianity had significantly reduced the demand for these commodities, causing a major economic slump in southern Arabia which helped to create the impression that Arabia was a backward region.

=== Byzantine–Sasanian Wars ===
Arab conquests of the Sasanian Empire and Syria 620–630

The prolonged and escalating Byzantine–Sasanian wars of the 6th and 7th centuries and the recurring outbreaks of bubonic plague (Plague of Justinian) left both empires exhausted and weakened in the face of the sudden emergence and expansion of the Arabs. The last of these wars ended with victory for the Byzantines: Emperor Heraclius regained all lost territories and restored the True Cross to Jerusalem in 629. The war against Zoroastrian Persia, whose people revered fire as a symbol of divine power, had been portrayed by Heraclius as a holy war in defense of the Christian faith and the Wood of the Holy Cross, as splinters of wood said to be from the True Cross were known, had been used to inspire Christian fighting zeal. The idea of a holy war against the "fire worshipers", as the Christians called the Zoroastrians, had aroused much enthusiasm, leading to an all-out effort to defeat the Sassanid Persians.

Nevertheless, neither empire was given any chance to recover, as within a few years they were overrun by the advances of the Arabs (newly united by Islam), which, according to James Howard-Johnston, "can only be likened to a human tsunami". According to George Liska, the "unnecessarily prolonged Byzantine–Persian conflict opened the way for Islam".

=== Conquest of the Arabian Peninsula ===
According to Islamic tradition, Muhammad, a merchant from Mecca, began receiving revelations from God through the archangel Gabriel, emphasizing the worship of one God and social justice. After entering conflict with and persecution by the elite of Mecca, he migrated to the city of Yathrib (Medina), where he established the first Islamic state. By 630, he and his followers returned to and conquered Mecca. Already, late in Muhammad's life, the first Muslim-Byzantine skirmishes took place, such as during the Battle of Mu'tah in 629. In 632, Muhammad died and was succeeded by the first caliph, Abu Bakr, who united the Arabian Peninsula after the Ridda Wars.

=== Factors promoting the success of the conquests ===
Many of the material conditions of the pre-Islamic Arabian Peninsula and ancient Near East enabled the success of the conquests. First, over the course of the sixth and early seventh century, all major state and military powers of the Arabian Peninsula dissolved, leaving behind a power vacuum. For the Byzantine and Persian empires, they each respectively projected power into the Arabian peninsula through alliances with two major Arab kingdoms, the Ghassanids and the Lakhmids. The main function of these kingdoms, for the empires, was to serve as buffer states protecting the empires from military incursions by Arab nomads, and to wage proxy wars against each other. However, in the late sixth century, both empires sought direct control over their borders with the Peninsula, and deposed their respective client kingdoms in the process, a few years before the start of the Byzantine-Sasanian wars. The only other principal military force on the Peninsula, the Himyarite Kingdom of South Arabia, had already dissolved by the middle of the sixth century, due to a combination of military, climactic, and economic factors.

By the mid-630s, in the years immediately before the invasion of the Near East, the now-united Arabian Peninsula had achieved its greatest power relative to that of the Near Eastern forces. The Byzantine and Persian powers were unusually weak at this time, as a consequence of a catastrophic and full-fledged thirty-year war between the two that had depleted their manpower, resources, and morale. By contrast, the Arabian Peninsula had been united under a singular leadership for the first time. Accordingly, "the military energy of the Arabs, hitherto dissipated in low-level conflicts between tribal groups, could now be redirected to the conquest of the vastly richer lands beyond the Arabian borders, catching the empires at a time when they were least able to parry this threat. In short, if the Arabs were ever to conquer themselves an empire, this was when it had to happen."

Historians have compared the early Muslim conquests to other conquests. According to Robert Hoyland, lightning-speed conquests over large regions have historically been achieved by nomadic groups found beyond established civilizations, like the Mongols. McCants compares the Arab conquests to earlier conquests of the Near East, first by Alexander the Great of Macedon, and then by the Romans. Between the Macedonians, the early Romans, and the early Arabs, McCants says: "All three conquering peoples hailed from the margins of the Near East, and their conquests united separate, complex societies with ancient native traditions of learning and legitimation distinct from those of the conquerors and one another". In the decades before the Arab conquests by Muhammad and his successors, most of the Arabian Peninsula was previously united by the conquests of the South Arabian king Abraha, including almost all of Arabia Deserta, with multiple campaigns being launched into the Hejaz (which succeeded in conquering Medina) and even into southern Iraq. Abraha's power at this time is further reflected by his hosting of an international conference which included ambassadors being sent for attendance from across the Byzantine, Persian, Ghassanid, and Lakhmid powers. In the 600s and 610s, the region of the Near East north of the Arabian Peninsula, was already under a constant fear and threat of Arab invasion. Already in the mid-6th century, the Romans had to sign a peace treaty that involved paying tribute to Arab kingdoms so as not to be attacked by them. The Battle of Dhi Qar, taking place between 604 and 611, already resulted in an Arab tribal confederation, the Banu Bakr, defeating the Sasanians in southern Iraq and reducing Sasanian control over Eastern Arabia.

== Armies ==
=== Arab ===
In Arabia, swords from India were greatly esteemed as being made of the finest steel and were the favorite weapons of the Mujahideen. The Arab sword known as the sayfy closely resembled the Byzantine gladius. Swords and spears were the major weapons of the Muslims, and armour was either mail or leather.

In northern Arabia, Byzantine influence predominated; in eastern Arabia, Persian influence predominated; and in Yemen, Indian influence was felt. As the caliphate spread, the Muslims were influenced by the peoples they conquered—the Turkic peoples in Central Asia, the Persians, and the Byzantines in Syria. The Bedouin tribes of Arabia favored archery, though contrary to popular belief Bedouin archers usually fought on foot instead of horseback. The Arabs usually fought defensive battles with their archers placed on both flanks.

By the Umayyad period, the caliphate had a standing army, including the elite Ahl al-Sham ("people of Syria"), raised from the Arabs who settled in Syria. The caliphate was divided into jund, or regional armies, stationed in the provinces being made of mostly Arab tribes who were paid monthly by the Diwan al-Jaysh (War Ministry).

=== Byzantine ===
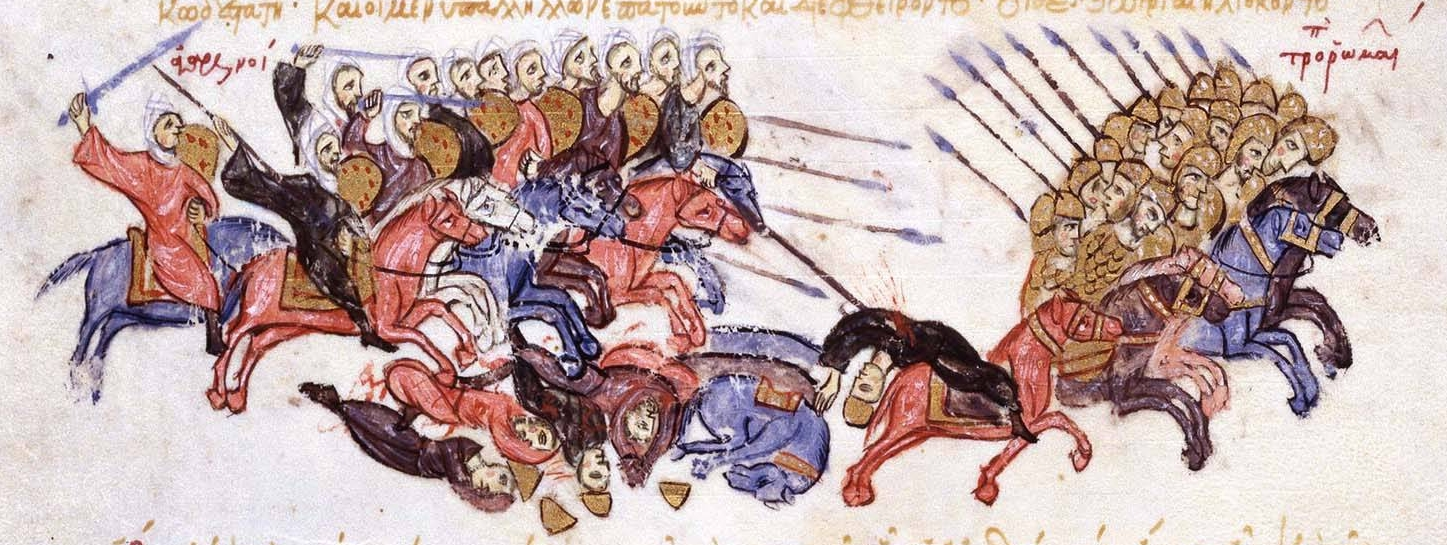
Arab cavalry pursue fleeing Byzantines

The infantry of the Byzantine army continued to be recruited from within the Byzantine Empire, but much of the cavalry were either recruited from "martial" peoples in the Balkans or in Asia Minor or alternatively were Germanic mercenaries. Most of the Byzantine troops in Syria were indigenae (local), and it seems that at the time of the Muslim conquest, the Byzantine forces in Syria were Arabs. In response to the loss of Syria, the Byzantines developed the phylarch system of using Armenian and Arab Christian auxiliaries living on the frontier to provide a "shield" to counter raiding by the Muslims into the empire. Overall, the Byzantine army remained a small but professional force of foederati. Unlike the foederati who were sent where they were needed, the stradioti lived in the frontier provinces.

=== Persian ===
During the last decades of the Sasanian empire, the frequent use of royal titles by Persian governors in Central Asia, especially in what is now Afghanistan, indicates a weakening of the power of the Shahanshah (King of Kings), suggesting the empire was already breaking down at the time of the Muslim conquest. Persian society was rigidly divided into castes with the nobility being of supposed "Aryan" descent, and this division of Persian society along caste lines was reflected in the military. The azatan aristocracy provided the cavalry, the paighan infantry came from the peasantry and most of the greater Persian nobility had slave soldiers, this last being based on the Persian example. Much of the Persian army consisted of tribal mercenaries recruited from the plains south of the Caspian Sea and from what is now Afghanistan. The Persian tactics were cavalry based with the Persian forces usually divided into a center, based upon a hill, and two wings of cavalry on either side.

=== Ethiopian ===
Little is known about the military forces of the Christian state of Ethiopia other than that they were divided into sarawit professional troops and the ehzab auxiliaries. The Ethiopians made much use of camels and elephants.

=== Berber ===
The Berbers of North Africa had often served as foederati (auxiliaries) in the Byzantine army. Berber forces were based around the horse and camel but seemed to have been hampered by a lack of weapons or protection, with both Byzantine and Arab sources mentioning the Berbers lacked armour and helmets. The Berbers went to war with their entire communities, and the presence of women and children both slowed down the Berber armies and tied down Berber tribesmen who tried to protect their families.

=== Turkic ===
The British historian David Nicolle called the Turkic peoples of Central Asia the "most formidable foes" faced by the Muslims. The Khazar Khaganate, based in what is now southern Russia and Ukraine, had a powerful heavy cavalry. Central Asia was divided into five khanates whose khans variously recognized the Shahs of Iran or the Emperors of China as their overlords.

Turkic society was feudal with the khans only being pater primus among the aristocracy of dihquans who lived in castles in the countryside, with the rest of Turkic forces being divided into kadivar (farmers), khidmatgar (servants) and atbai (clients). The heavily armored Turkic cavalry played a significant role in influencing subsequent Muslim tactics and weapons; the Turkic peoples, who were mostly Buddhists at the time of the Islamic conquest, later converted to Islam and came to be regarded as the foremost Muslim warriors, to the extent of replacing the Arabs as the dominant peoples in the Dar al-Islam (House of Islam).

=== Visigothic ===
During the migration period, the Germanic Visigoths had traveled from their homeland north of the Danube to settle in the Roman province of Hispania, creating a kingdom upon the ruins of the Western Roman Empire. The Visigothic state in Iberia was based around forces raised by the nobility whom the king could call out in the event of war. The king had his gardingi and fideles loyal to himself, while the nobility had their bucellarii. The Visigoths favored cavalry with their favorite tactics being to repeatedly charge a foe combined with feigned retreats.

The Muslim conquest of most of Iberia in less than a decade does suggest serious deficiencies with the Visigothic Kingdom, though the limited sources make it difficult to discern the precise reasons for the collapse of the Visigoths.

=== Frankish ===
Another Germanic people who founded a state following the collapse of the Western Roman Empire were the Franks who settled in Gaul. Like the Visigoths, the Frankish cavalry played a "significant part" in their wars. The Frankish kings expected all of their male subjects to perform three months of military service every year, and all serving under the king's banner were paid a regular salary. Those called up for service had to provide their own weapons and horses, which contributed to the "militarisation of Frankish society". At least part of the reason for the victories of Charles Martel was he could call up a force of experienced warriors when faced with Muslim raids.

== Campaigns ==
=== Conquest of Syria: 634–641 ===
The province of Syria was the first to be wrested from Byzantine control. Arab-Muslim raids that followed the Ridda Wars prompted the Byzantines to send a major expedition into southern Palestine, which was defeated by the Arab forces under command of Khalid ibn al-Walid at the Battle of Ajnadayn in 634. Khalid had converted to Islam around 627, becoming one of Muhammad's most successful generals. Khalid had been fighting in Iraq against the Sasanians when he led his force on a trek across the deserts to Syria to attack the Byzantines from the rear. In the Battle of the Mud fought near Pella (Fahl) and nearby Scythopolis (Beisan), both in the Jordan Valley, in December 634 or January 635, the Arabs scored another victory. After a siege of six months the Arabs took Damascus, but Emperor Heraclius later retook it. At the Battle of Yarmuk (636), the Arabs were victorious, defeating Heraclius. Khalid appears to have been the "real military leader" at Yarmuk "under the nominal command of others". Syria was ordered to be abandoned to the Muslims with Heraclius reportedly saying: "Peace be with you Syria; what a beautiful land you will be for your enemy". On the heels of their victory, the Arab armies took Damascus again in 636, with Baalbek, Homs, and Hama to follow soon afterwards. However, other fortified towns continued to resist despite the rout of the imperial army and had to be conquered individually. Jerusalem fell in 638, Caesarea in 640, while others held out until 641.

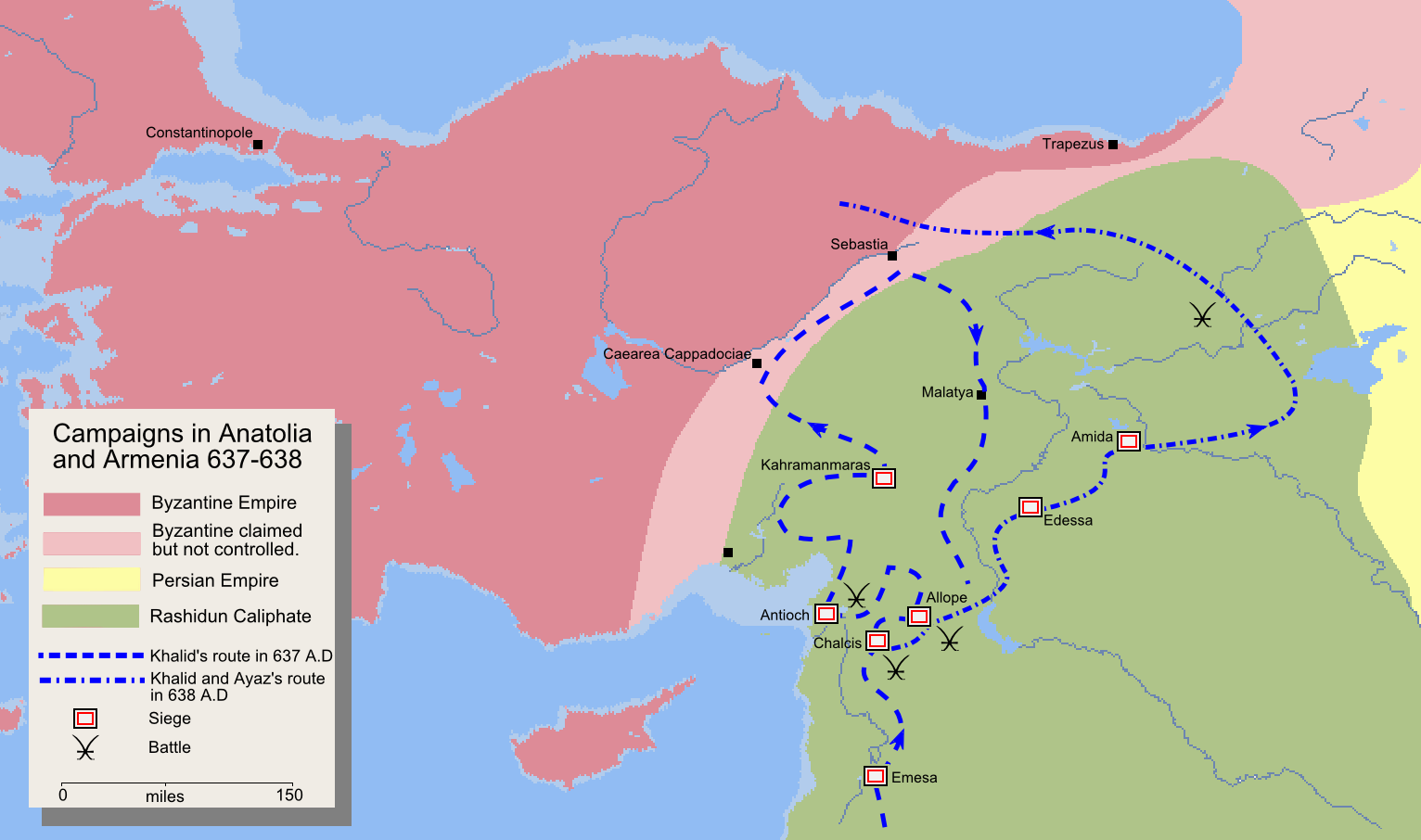
Arab campaigns in Anatolia 637–638

After a two-year siege, the garrison of Jerusalem surrendered; under the terms of the surrender Caliph Umar promised to tolerate the Christians of Jerusalem and not to turn churches into mosques. True to his word, Umar allowed the Church of the Holy Sepulchre to remain, with the caliph praying on a prayer rug outside of the church. The loss to the Muslims of Jerusalem, the holiest city to Christians, proved to be the source of much resentment in Christendom. The city of Caesarea Maritima continued to withstand the Muslim siege—as it could be supplied by sea—until it was taken by assault in 640.

In the mountains of Asia Minor, the Muslims enjoyed less success, with the Byzantines adopting the tactic of "shadowing warfare" — refusing to give battle to the Muslims, while the people retreated into castles and fortified towns when the Muslims invaded; instead, Byzantine forces ambushed Muslim raiders as they returned to Syria carrying plunder and people they had enslaved. In the frontier area where Anatolia met Syria, the Byzantine state evacuated the entire population and laid waste to the countryside, creating a no man's land where any invading army would find no food. For decades afterwards, a guerrilla war was waged by Christians in the hilly countryside of north-western Syria supported by the Byzantines. At the same time, the Byzantines began a policy of launching raids via sea on the coast of the caliphate with the aim of forcing the Muslims to keep at least some of their forces to defend their coastlines, thus limiting the number of troops available for an invasion of Anatolia. Unlike Syria with its plains and deserts — which favored the offensive — the mountainous terrain of Anatolia favored the defensive, and for centuries afterwards the line between the Byzantine Empire and the Arab Caliphate ran along the border between Anatolia and Syria.

=== Conquest of Egypt: 639–642 ===
The Byzantine Empire after the Arabs conquered the provinces of Syria and Egypt c. 650

The Byzantine province of Egypt held strategic importance for its grain production, naval yards, and as a base for further conquests in Africa. The Muslim general Amr ibn al-As began the conquest of the province on his own initiative in 639. The majority of the Byzantine forces in Egypt were locally raised Coptic forces, intended to serve more as a police force; since the vast majority of Egyptians lived in the Nile River valley, surrounded on both the eastern and western sides by desert, Egypt was felt to be a relatively secure province. In December 639, Amr entered the Sinai with a large force and captured Pelusium, on the edge of the Nile River valley, and then defeated a Byzantine counter-attack at Bibays. Contrary to expectations, the Arabs did not head for Alexandria, the capital of Egypt, but instead for the Babylon Fortress located at what is now Cairo. Amr was planning to divide the Nile River valley in two. The Arab forces won a major victory at the Battle of Heliopolis in 640, but they found it difficult to advance further because major cities in the Nile Delta were protected by water and because Amr lacked the machinery to break down city fortifications.

The Arabs laid siege to Babylon, and its starving garrison surrendered on 9 April 641. Nevertheless, the province was scarcely urbanized and the defenders lost hope of receiving reinforcements from Constantinople when the emperor Heraclius died in 641. Afterwards, the Arabs turned north into the Nile Delta and laid siege to Alexandria. The last major urban center to fall into Arab hands was Alexandria, which capitulated in September 642. According to Hugh Kennedy, "Of all the early Muslim conquests, that of Egypt was the swiftest and most complete. [...] Seldom in history can so massive a political change have happened so swiftly and been so long lasting." In 644, the Arabs suffered a major defeat by the Caspian Sea when an invading Muslim army was almost wiped out by the cavalry of the Khazar Khaganate, and, seeing a chance to take back Egypt, the Byzantines launched an amphibious attack which temporarily took back Alexandria. Though most of Egypt is desert, the Nile Delta has some of the most productive and fertile farmland in the entire world, which had made Egypt the "granary" of the Byzantine Empire. Control of Egypt meant that the caliphate could weather droughts without the fear of famine, laying the basis for the future prosperity of the caliphate.

==== Arab–Byzantine naval warfare ====
Map of the main Byzantine-Muslim naval operations and battles in the Mediterranean

The Byzantine Empire had traditionally dominated the Mediterranean and the Black Seas with major naval bases at Constantinople, Acre, Alexandria and Carthage. In 652, the Arabs won their first victory at sea off Alexandria, which was followed by the Muslim conquest of Cyprus. As Yemen had been a center of maritime trade, Yemeni sailors were brought to Alexandria to start building a Muslim fleet for the Mediterranean Sea.

The Muslim fleet was based in Alexandria and used Acre, Tyre and Beirut as its forward bases. The core of the fleet's sailors were Yemeni, but the shipwrights who built the ships were Iranian and Iraqi. In the Battle of the Masts off Cape Chelidonia in Anatolia in 655, the Muslims defeated the Byzantine fleet in a series of boarding actions. As a result, the Byzantines began a major expansion of their navy, which was matched by the Arabs, leading to a naval arms race. From the early 8th century onward, the Muslim fleet would launch annual raids on the coastline on the Byzantine empire in Anatolia and Greece.

As part of the arms race, both sides sought new technology to improve their warships. Muslim warships had a larger forecastle, which was used to mount a stone-throwing engine, while the Byzantines invented Greek fire, an incendiary weapon that led the Muslims to cover their ships with water-soaked cotton. A major problem for the Muslim fleet was the shortage of timber, which led the Muslims to seek qualitative instead of quantitative superiority by building bigger warships. To save money, the Muslim shipwrights switched from the hull-first method of building ships to the frame-first method.

=== Conquest of Mesopotamia and Persia: 633–651 ===
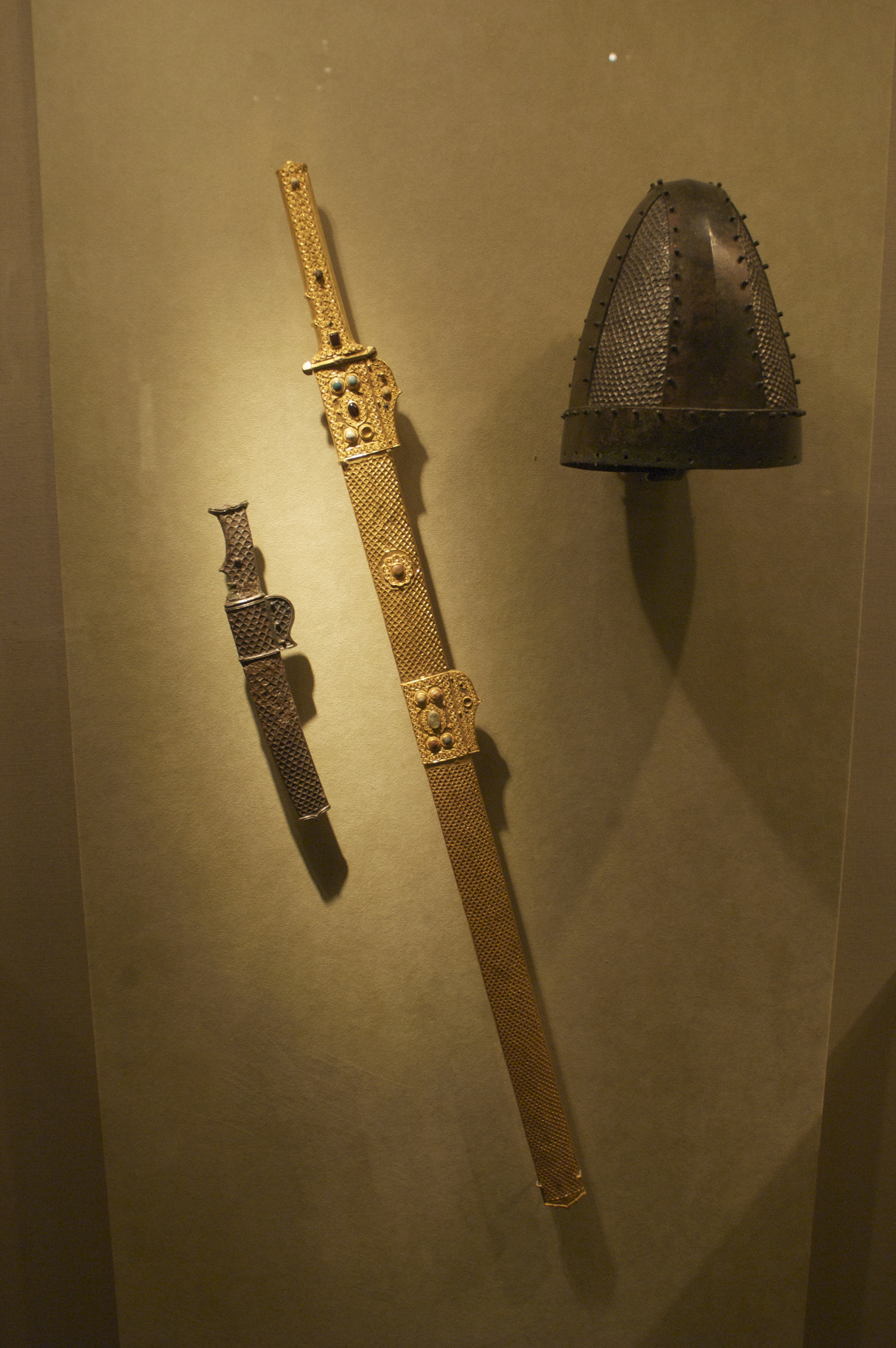
Sasanian weaponry, 7th century

After an Arab incursion into Sasanian territories, the Shah Yazdegerd III, who had just ascended the Persian throne, raised an army to resist the conquerors, although many marzbans refused to help. The Persians suffered a devastating defeat at the Battle of al-Qadisiyyah in 636. Little is known about the Battle of al-Qadisiyyah other than it lasted for several days by the banks of the river Euphrates in what is now Iraq and ended with the Persian force being annihilated. Abolishing the Lakhmid Arab buffer state had forced the Persians to take over the desert defense themselves, leaving them overextended.

As a result of al-Qadisiyyah, the Arab Muslims gained control over the whole of Iraq, including Ctesiphon, the capital city of the Sassanids. The Persians lacked sufficient forces to make use of the Zagros Mountains to stop the Arabs, having lost the prime of their army at al-Qadisiyyah. The Persian forces withdrew over the Zagros, and the Arab army pursued them across the Iranian plateau, where the fate of the Sasanian Empire was sealed at the Battle of Nahavand in 642. The crushing Muslim victory at Nahavand is known in the Muslim world as the "Victory of Victories".

After Nahavand, the Persian state collapsed with Yazdegerd III fleeing further east and various marzbans surrendering to the Arabs. As the conquerors slowly covered the vast distances of Iran punctuated by hostile towns and fortresses, Yazdegerd III retreated, finally taking refuge in Khorasan, where he was assassinated by a local satrap in 651. In the aftermath of their victory over the imperial army, the Muslims still had to contend with a collection of militarily weak but geographically inaccessible principalities of Persia. It took decades to bring them all under control of the caliphate. In what is now Afghanistan—a region where the authority of the Shah was always disputed—the Muslims met fierce guerrilla resistance from the militant Buddhist tribes of the region. Despite the complete Muslim triumph over Sasanid Iran as compared to the only partial defeat of the Byzantine Empire, the Muslims borrowed far more from the vanished Sassanian state than they ever did from the Byzantines. However, for the Persians the defeat remained bitter. Some 400 years later, the Persian poet Ferdowsi lets Yazdegerd III speak in his popular poem Shahnameh (Book of Kings):

Damn this world, damn this time, damn this fate,
That uncivilized Arabs have come to
Make me a Muslim
Where are your valiant warriors and priests
Where are your hunting parties and your feats?
Where is that warlike mien and where are those
Great armies that destroyed our county's foes?
Count Iran as a ruin, as the lair
Of lions and leopards.
Look now and despair

=== Canonization of the Quran ===
Right from the start of the caliphate, it was realized that there was a need to write down the Quran, which had been memorized by Muhammad's followers or written on parchment, before they all died. To preserve the Quran, a concerted effort was made to bring together what many had memorized or written down in fragments. Differing dialects of Arab tribes had led to different versions of the Quran in Damascus, Homs, Basra and Kufa by 644. To settle the dispute, Caliph Uthman proclaimed the version of the Quran possessed by one of Muhammad's widows, Hafsa, to be the definitive and correct version.

=== First Fitna: Establishment of the Umayyad Caliphate ===
The favoritism shown by Caliph Uthman to his family, the Umayyad clan, in government appointments as well as land and monetary grants, and his efforts to centralise control over provincial revenues, led to a mutiny in Medina that resulted in his assassination in 656. After Uthman's death, Ali was elected as the fourth caliph, but Uthman's kinsman and the long-time governor of Syria, Mu'awiya ibn Abi Sufyan, denounced his legitimacy and declared war. During this time, the first period of Arab conquests stopped, as the armies of Islam turned against one another in the first Muslim civil war. Ali was killed by the breakaway Kharijites in January 661, allowing Mu'awiya to become caliph and establish the Umayyad dynasty, with the capital of the caliphate being moved to Damascus. Mu'awiya followed the conquest of Iran by invading Central Asia and trying to finish off the Byzantine Empire by taking Constantinople. In 670, a Muslim fleet seized Rhodes and then laid siege to Constantinople. Nicolle wrote the siege of Constantinople from 670 to 677 was "more accurately" a blockade rather than a siege proper, which ended in failure as the "mighty" walls built by the Emperor Theodosius II in the 5th century proved their worth.

The majority of the people in Syria remained Christian, and a substantial Jewish minority remained as well; both communities were to greatly influence the Arabs in science, trade and the arts. The Umayyad caliphs are well-remembered for sponsoring a cultural "golden age" in Islamic history—for example, by building the Dome of the Rock in Jerusalem and for making Damascus into the capital of a "superpower" that stretched from Portugal to Central Asia, covering the vast territory from the Atlantic Ocean to the borders of China.

=== Explanations for the Muslim armies' success ===
The rapidity of the early conquests has received various explanations. Contemporary Christian writers conceived them as God's punishment visited on their fellow Christians for their sins. Early Muslim historians viewed them as a reflection of the religious zeal of the conquerors and evidence of divine favor. The theory that the conquests are explainable as an Arab migration triggered by economic pressures enjoyed popularity early in the 20th century but has largely fallen out of favor among historians, especially those who distinguish the migration from the conquests that preceded and enabled it.

There are indications that the conquests started as initially disorganized pillaging raids launched partly by non-Muslim Arab tribes in the aftermath of the Ridda Wars and were soon extended into a war of conquest by the Rashidun caliphs, although other scholars argue that the conquests were a planned military venture already underway during Muhammad's lifetime. Fred Donner writes that the advent of Islam "revolutionized both the ideological bases and the political structures of the Arabian society, giving rise for the first time to a state capable of an expansionist movement." According to Chase F. Robinson, it is likely that Muslim forces were often outnumbered, but unlike their opponents, they were fast, well-coordinated and highly motivated.

Another key reason was the weakness of the Byzantine and Sasanian Empires, caused by the wars they had waged against each other in the preceding decades with alternating success. It was aggravated by a plague that had struck densely populated areas and impeded conscription of new imperial troops, while the Arab armies could draw recruits from nomadic populations. The Sasanian Empire, which had lost the latest round of hostilities with the Byzantines, was also affected by a crisis of confidence, and its elites suspected that the ruling dynasty had forfeited the favor of the gods. The Arab military advantage was increased when Christianized Arab tribes who had served imperial armies as regular or auxiliary troops switched sides and joined the West Arabian coalition. Arab commanders also made liberal use of agreements to spare lives and property of inhabitants in case of surrender and extended exemptions from paying tribute to groups who provided military services to the conquerors. Additionally, the Byzantine persecution of Christians opposed to the Chalcedonian creed in Syria and Egypt alienated elements of those communities and made them more open to accommodation with the Arabs once it became clear that the latter would let them practice their faith undisturbed as long as they paid tribute.

The conquests were further secured by the subsequent large-scale migration of Arabian peoples into the conquered lands. Robert Hoyland argues that the failure of the Sasanian Empire to recover was due in large part to the geographically and politically disconnected nature of Persia, which made coordinated action difficult once the established Sasanian rule collapsed. Similarly, the difficult terrain of Anatolia made it difficult for the Byzantines to mount a large-scale attack to recover the lost lands, and their offensive action was largely limited to organizing guerrilla operations against the Arabs in the Levant.

=== Conquest of Sindh: 711–714 ===
Although there were sporadic incursions by Arab generals in the direction of India in the 660s and a small Arab garrison was established in the arid region of Makran in the 670s, the first large-scale Arab campaign in the Indus valley occurred when the general Muhammad ibn al-Qasim invaded Sindh in 711 after a coastal march through Makran. Three years later the Arabs controlled all of the lower Indus valley. Most of the towns seem to have submitted to Arab rule under peace treaties, although there was fierce resistance in other areas, including by the forces of Raja Dahir at the capital city Debal. Arab incursions southward from Sindh were repulsed by the armies of Gurjara and Chalukya kingdoms, and further Islamic expansion was checked by the Rashtrakuta dynasty, which gained control of the region shortly after.

=== Conquest of the Maghreb: 647–742 ===
Arab forces began launching sporadic raiding expeditions into Cyrenaica (modern northeast Libya) and beyond soon after their conquest of Egypt. Byzantine rule in northwest Africa at the time was largely confined to the coastal plains, while Berber kingdoms and tribes controlled the rest. In 670 Arabs founded the settlement of Qayrawan, which gave them a forward base for further expansion. Muslim historians credit the general Uqba ibn Nafi with subsequent conquest of lands extending to the Atlantic coast, although it appears to have been a temporary incursion. The Berber king Kusayla and an enigmatic leader referred to as Kahina (prophetess or priestess) seem to have mounted effective, if short-lived resistance to Muslim rule at the end of the 7th century, but the sources do not give a clear picture of these events. Arab forces were able to capture Carthage in 698 and Tangiers by 708. After the fall of Tangiers, many Berbers joined the Muslim army. In 740 Umayyad rule in the region was shaken by a major Berber revolt, which also involved Kharijite activists. After a series of defeats, the caliphate was finally able to crush the rebellion in 742, although local Berber dynasties continued to drift away from imperial control from that time on.

=== Conquest of Hispania and Septimania: 711–721 ===
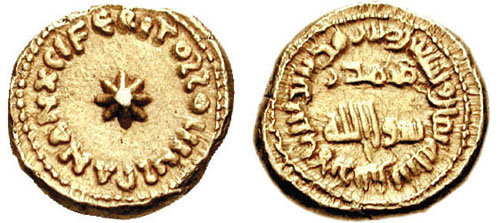
Bilingual Latin-Arabic dinar minted in Iberia AH 98 (716/7 AD)

The Muslim conquest of Hispania is notable for the brevity and unreliability of the available sources. After the Visigothic king of Spain Wittiza died in 710, the kingdom experienced a period of political division. The Visigothic nobility was divided between the followers of Wittiza and his successor Roderic. Akhila, Wittiza's son, had fled to Morocco after losing the succession struggle, and Muslim tradition states that he asked the Muslims to invade Spain. Starting in the summer of 710, the Muslim forces in Morocco had launched several successful raids into Spain, which demonstrated the weakness of the Visigothic state.

Taking advantage of the situation, the Muslim Berber commander, Tariq ibn Ziyad, who was stationed in Tangiers at the time, crossed the Strait of Gibraltar with an army of Arabs and Berbers in 711. Most of the invasion force of 15,000 were Berbers, with the Arabs serving as an "elite" force. Tariq landed on the Rock of Gibraltar on 29 April 711. After defeating Roderic at the river Guadalete on 19 July 711, Muslim forces advanced, capturing cities one after another. The capital of Toledo surrendered peacefully. Some of the cities surrendered with agreements to pay tribute and local aristocracy retained a measure of former influence. The Spanish Jewish community welcomed the Muslims as liberators from the oppression of the Catholic Visigothic kings.

In 712, a larger force of 18,000 from Morocco, led by Musa ibn Nusayr, crossed the Strait of Gibraltar to link up with Tariq's force at Talavera. The invasion seemed to have been on the initiative of Tariq: the caliph, al-Walid, in Damascus reacted with surprise. By 713 Hispania was almost entirely under Muslim control. In 714, al-Walid summoned Tariq to Damascus to explain his campaign in Spain, but Tariq took his time travelling through North Africa, and was finally imprisoned by al-Walid's successor Sulayman ibn Abd al-Malik when he arrived in Damascus. The events of the subsequent ten years, the details of which are obscure, included the capture of Barcelona and Narbonne, and a raid against Toulouse, followed by an expedition into Burgundy in 725.

The last large-scale raid to the north ended with a Muslim defeat at the Battle of Tours at the hands of the Franks in 732. The victory of the Franks, led by Charles Martel, over 'Abd al-Rahman ibn 'Abd Allah al-Ghafiqi has often been misrepresented as the decisive battle that stopped the Muslim conquest of France, but the Umayyad force had been raiding Aquitaine with a particular interest in sacking churches and monasteries, not seeking its conquest. The battle itself is a shadowy affair with the few sources describing it in poetic terms that are frustrating for the historian. The battle occurred between 18 and 25 October 732 with the climax being an attack on the Muslim camp led by Martel that ended with al-Ghafiqi being killed and the Muslims withdrawing when night fell. Martel's victory ended whatever plans there may have been to conquer France, but a series of Berber revolts in North Africa and in Spain against Arab rule may have played a greater role in ruling out conquests north of the Pyrenees.

=== Conquest of Transoxiana: 673–751 ===
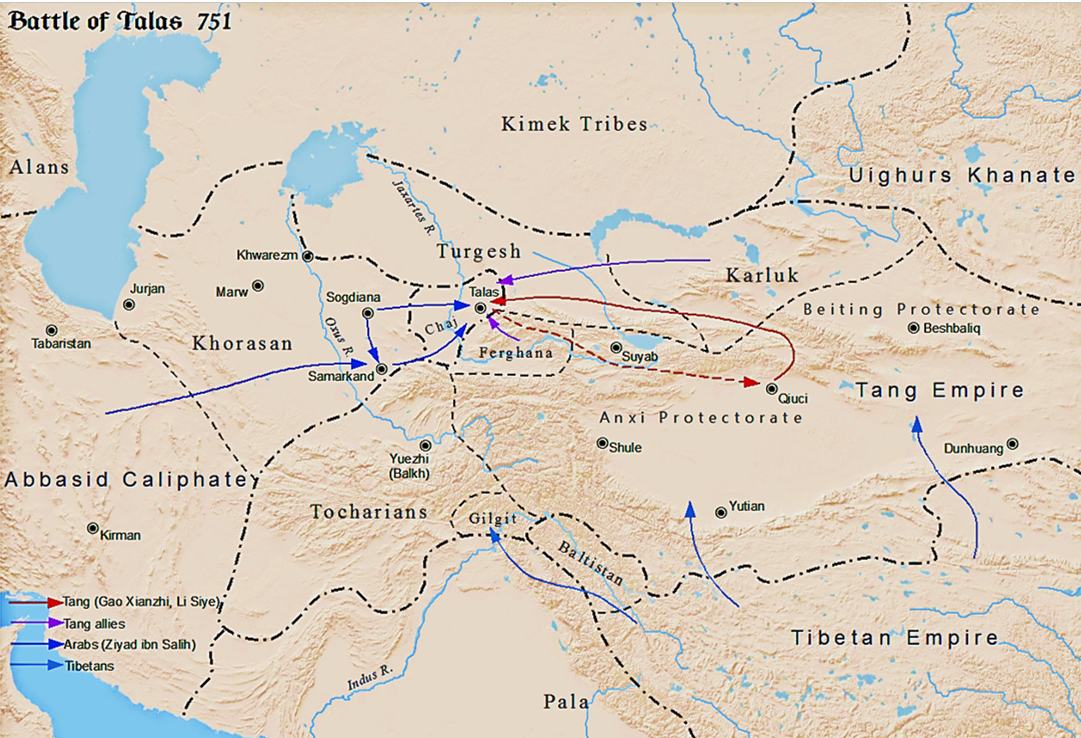
Battle of Talas between Tang dynasty and Abbasid Caliphate c. 751

Transoxiana is the region northeast of Iran beyond the Amu Darya or Oxus River roughly corresponding with modern-day Uzbekistan, Tajikistan, and parts of Kazakhstan. Initial incursions across the Oxus River were aimed at Bukhara (673) and Samarkand (675), and the results were limited to promises of tribute payments. In 674, a Muslim force led by Ubayd Allah ibn Ziyad attacked Bukhara, the capital of Sogdia, which ended with the Sogdians agreeing to pay tribute to the Umayyad caliph Mu'awiya I, who they recognized as their overlord.

In general, the campaigns in Central Asia were "hard fought" with the Buddhist Turkic peoples fiercely resisting efforts to incorporate them into the caliphate. China, which saw Central Asia as its own sphere of influence, particularly because of the economic importance of the Silk Road, supported the Turkic defenders. Further advances were hindered for a quarter century by political upheavals within the Umayyad caliphate. This was followed by a decade of rapid military progress under the leadership of the new governor of Khurasan, Qutayba ibn Muslim, which included the conquest of Bukhara and Samarqand in 706–712. The expansion lost its momentum when Qutayba was killed during an army mutiny and the Arabs were placed on the defensive by an alliance of Sogdian and Türgesh forces with support from Tang China. However, reinforcements from Syria helped turn the tide and most of the lost lands were reconquered by 741. Muslim rule over Transoxania was consolidated in 751 when a Chinese-led army was defeated at the Battle of Talas.

=== Expeditions into Afghanistan ===
Medieval Islamic scholars divided the area of modern-day Afghanistan into two regions: the provinces of Khorasan and Sistan. Khorasan was the eastern satrapy of the Sasanian Empire, containing Balkh and Herat. Sistan included Ghazna, Zarang, Bost, Qandahar (also called al-Rukhkhaj or Zamindawar), Kabul, Kabulistan and Zabulistan.

Before Muslim rule, the regions of Balkh (Bactria or Tokharistan), Herat and Sistan were under Sasanian rule. Further south in the Balkh region, in Bamiyan, indication of Sasanian authority diminishes, with a local dynasty apparently ruling, probably Hephthalites subject to the Yabghu of the Western Turkic Khaganate. While Herat was controlled by the Sasanians, its hinterlands were controlled by northern Hephthalites who continued to rule the Ghurid mountains and river valleys well into the Islamic era. Sistan was under Sasanian administration, but Qandahar remained out of Arab hands. Kabul and Zabulistan housed Indic religions, with the Zunbils and Kabul Shahis (for the most part) offering stiff resistance to Muslim rule for two centuries until the Saffarid and Ghaznavid conquests. The Umayyad Caliphate regularly claimed nominal overlordship over the Zunbils and Kabul Shahis, and in 711 Qutayba ibn Muslim managed to force them to pay tribute.

=== Other expeditions ===
==== Cyprus, Armenia, and Georgia ====
In 646, a Byzantine naval expedition was able to briefly recapture Alexandria. The same year Mu'awiya, the long-serving governor of Syria and future founder of the Umayyad dynasty, ordered construction of a fleet. Three years later it was put to use in a pillaging raid of Cyprus, followed by a raid in 650 that concluded with a treaty under which Cypriots surrendered many of their riches and slaves. In 688 the island was made into a joint dominion of the caliphate and the Byzantine Empire under a pact which was to last for almost 300 years.

In 639–640 Arab forces began to make advances into Armenia, which had been partitioned into a Byzantine province and a Sasanian province. There is considerable disagreement among ancient and modern historians about events of the following years, and nominal control of the region may have passed several times between Arabs and Byzantines. Although Muslim dominion was finally established by the time the Umayyads acceded to power in 661, it was not able to implant itself solidly in the country, and Armenia experienced a national and literary efflorescence over the next century. As with Armenia, Arab advances into other lands of the Caucasus region, including Georgia, had as their end assurances of tribute payment and these principalities retained a large degree of autonomy. This period also saw a series of clashes with the Khazar Khaganate whose center of power was in the lower Volga steppes, and which vied with the caliphate over control of the Caucasus.

==== Failed incursions into Byzantium and Afghanistan ====
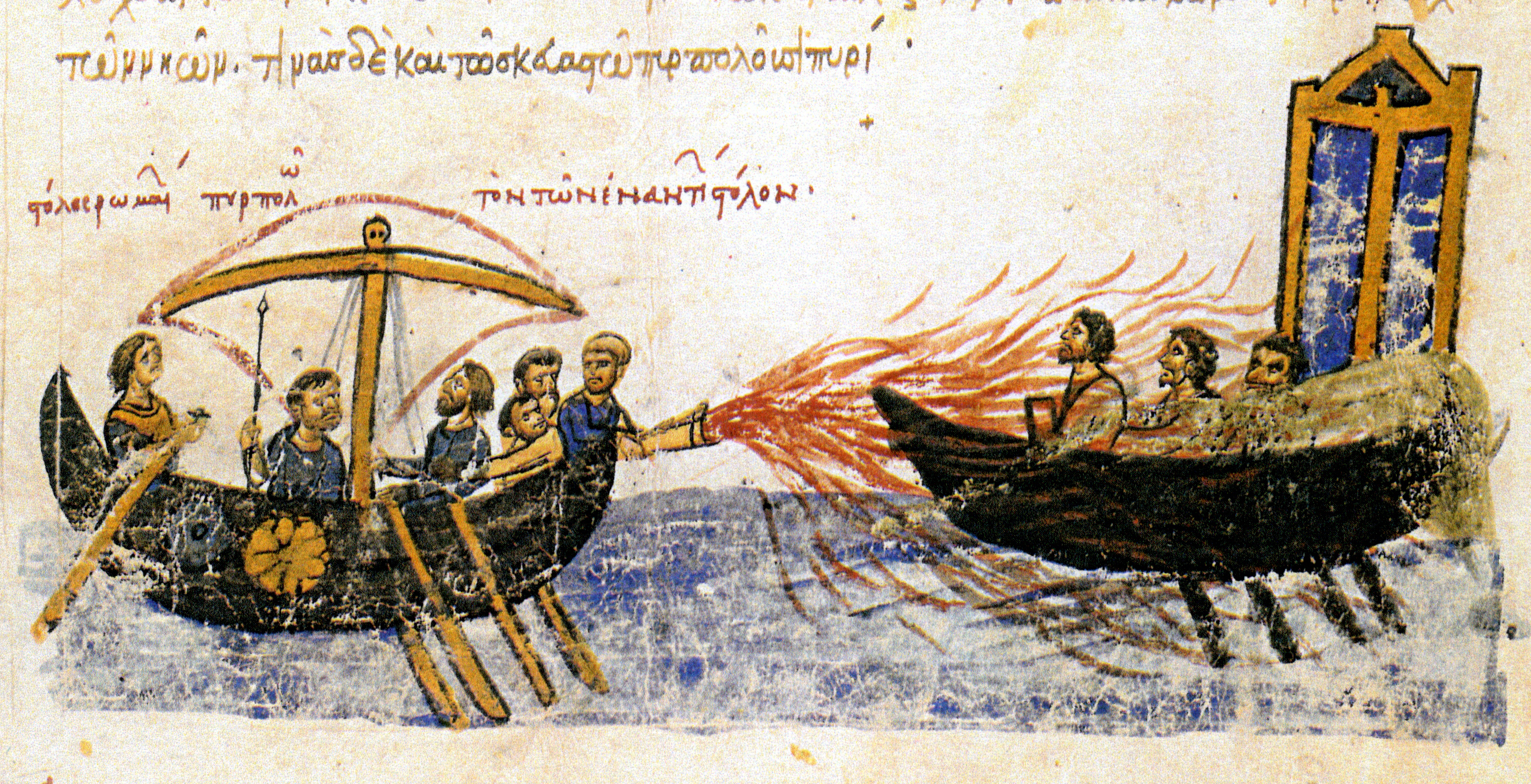
Byzantine manuscript illustration showing Greek fire in action

Other Muslim military ventures were met with outright failure. Despite a naval victory over the Byzantines in 654 at the Battle of the Masts, the subsequent attempt to besiege Constantinople was frustrated by a storm which damaged the Arab fleet. Later sieges of Constantinople in 668–669 (674–678 according to other estimates) and 717–718 were thwarted with the help of the recently invented Greek fire. In the east, although Arabs were able to establish control over most Sasanian-controlled areas of modern Afghanistan after the fall of Persia, the Kabul region resisted repeated attempts at invasion and would continue to do so until it was conquered by the Saffarids three centuries later.

==== End of the conquests ====
By the time of the Abbasid revolution in the middle of the 8th century, Muslim armies had come against a combination of natural barriers and powerful states that impeded any further military progress. The wars produced diminishing returns in personal gains and fighters increasingly left the army for civilian occupations. The priorities of the rulers also shifted from conquest of new lands to administration of the acquired empire. Although the Abbasid era witnessed some new territorial gains, such as the conquests of Sicily and Crete, the period of rapid centralized expansion would now give way to an era when further spread of Islam would be slow and accomplished through the efforts of local dynasties, missionaries, and traders.

== Aftermath ==
The early Muslim conquests by reign after Muhammad's unification of Arabia

=== Significance ===
Nicolle writes that the series of Islamic conquests of the 7th and 8th centuries was "one of the most significant events in world history", leading to the creation of "a new civilisation", the Islamicised and Arabised Middle East. Islam, which had previously been confined to Arabia, became a major world religion, while the synthesis of Arab, Byzantine, and Sasanian elements led to the emergence of distinctive new styles of art and architecture. English historian Edward Gibbon writes in The History of the Decline and Fall of the Roman Empire:

Under the last of the Umayyads, the Arabian empire extended two hundred days journey from east to west, from the confines of Tartary and India to the shores of the Atlantic Ocean ... We should vainly seek the indissoluble union and easy obedience that pervaded the government of Augustus and the Antonines; but the progress of Islam diffused over this ample space a general resemblance of manners and opinions. The language and laws of the Quran were studied with equal devotion at Samarcand and Seville: the Moor and the Indian embraced as countrymen and brothers in the pilgrimage of Mecca; and the Arabian language was adopted as the popular idiom in all the provinces to the westward of the Tigris.

=== Socio-political developments ===
The military victories of armies from the Arabian Peninsula heralded the expansion of Arab culture and religion. The conquests were followed by a large-scale migration of families and whole tribes from Arabia into the lands of the Middle East. The conquering Arabs had already possessed a complex and sophisticated society. Emigrants from Yemen brought with them agricultural, urban, and monarchical traditions; members of the Ghassanid and Lakhmid tribal confederations had experience collaborating with the empires. The rank and file of the armies was drawn from both nomadic and sedentary tribes, while the leadership came mainly from the merchant class of the Hejaz.

Two fundamental policies were implemented during the reign of the second caliph Umar (r. 634–644): the Bedouins would not be allowed to damage agricultural production of the conquered lands, and the leadership would cooperate with the local elites. To that end, the Arab-Muslim armies were settled in segregated quarters or new garrison towns such as Basra, Kufa, and Fustat. The latter two became the new administrative centers of Iraq and Egypt, respectively. Soldiers were paid a stipend and prohibited from seizing lands. Arab governors supervised collection and distribution of taxes but otherwise left the old religious and social order intact. At first, many provinces retained a large degree of autonomy upon their conquest under the terms of agreements made with Arab commanders.

As the time passed, the conquerors sought to increase their control over local affairs and make existing administrative machinery work for the new regime. This involved several types of reorganization. In the Mediterranean region, city-states which traditionally governed themselves and their surrounding areas were replaced by a territorial bureaucracy separating town and rural administration. In Egypt, fiscally independent estates and municipalities were abolished in favor of a simplified administrative system. In the early 8th century, Syrian Arabs began to replace Coptic functionaries and communal levies gave way to individual taxation. In Iran, the administrative reorganization and construction of protective walls prompted agglomeration of quarters and villages into large cities such as Isfahan, Qazvin, and Qom. Local notables of Iran, who at first had almost complete autonomy, were incorporated into the central bureaucracy by the Abbasid period. The similarity of Egyptian and Khorasani official paperwork at the time of the caliph al-Mansur (r. 754–775) suggests a highly centralized empire-wide administration.

==== New Arab settlements ====
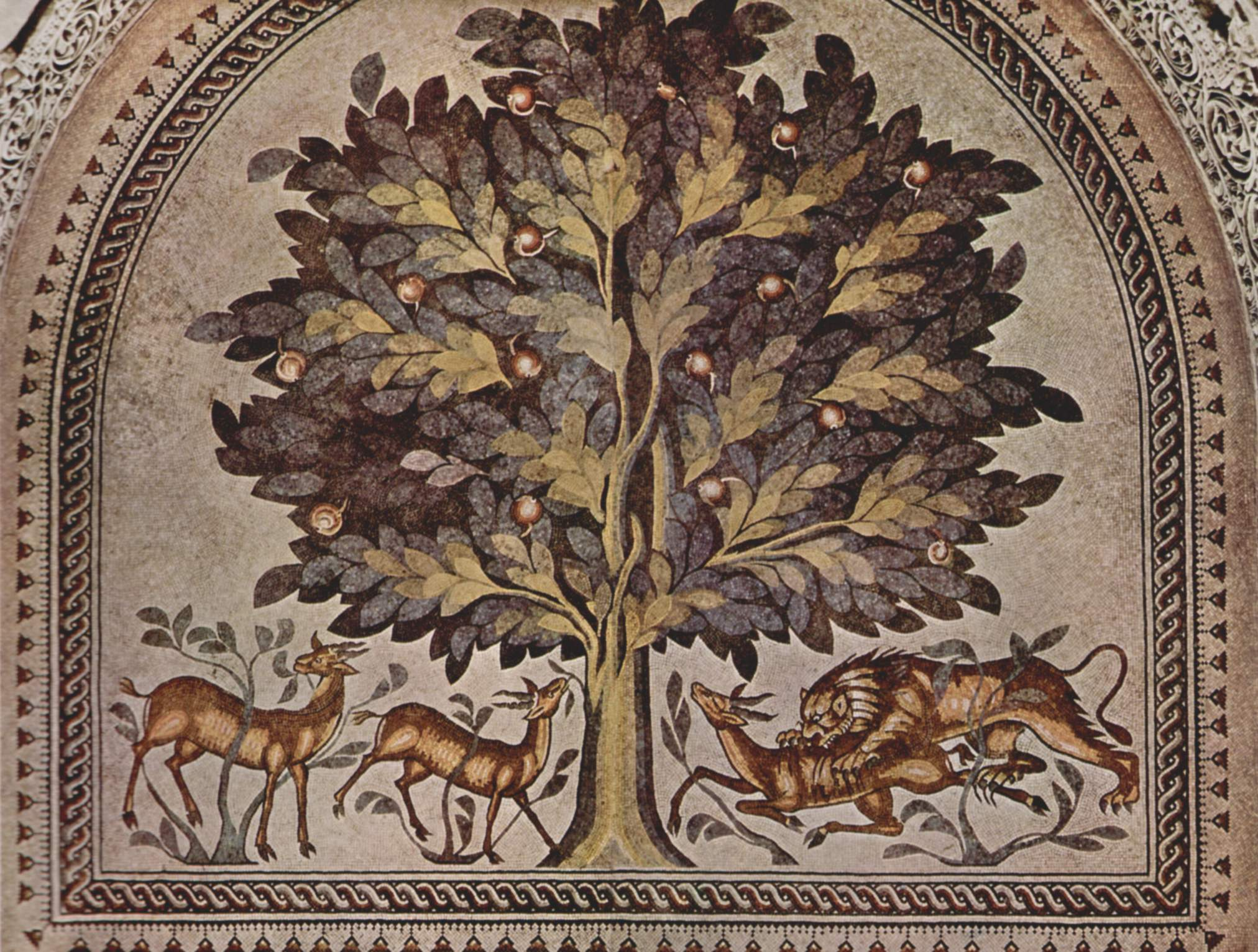
Mosaic from Hisham's Palace, an Umayyad residence near Jericho (c. 724–743)

The society of new Arab settlements gradually became stratified into classes based on wealth and power. It was also reorganized into new communal units that preserved clan and tribal names but were in fact only loosely based around old kinship bonds. Arab settlers turned to civilian occupations and in eastern regions established themselves as a landed aristocracy. At the same time, distinctions between the conquerors and local populations began to blur. In Iran, the Arabs largely assimilated into local culture, adopting the Persian language and customs and marrying Persian women. In Iraq, non-Arab settlers flocked to garrison towns. Soldiers and administrators of the old regime came to seek their fortunes with the new masters, while slaves, laborers and peasants fled there seeking to escape the harsh conditions of life in the countryside. Non-Arab converts to Islam were absorbed into the Arab-Muslim society through an adaptation of the tribal Arabian institution of clientage, in which protection of the powerful was exchanged for loyalty of the subordinates. The clients (mawali) and their heirs were regarded as virtual members of the clan. The clans became increasingly economically and socially stratified. For example, while the noble clans of the Tamim tribe acquired Persian cavalry units as their mawali, other clans of the same tribe had slave laborers as theirs. Slaves often became mawali of their former masters when they were freed.

Contrary to the belief of earlier historians, there is no evidence of mass conversions to Islam in the immediate aftermath of the conquests. The first groups to convert were Christian Arab tribes, although some of them retained their religion into the Abbasid era even while serving as troops of the caliphate. They were followed by former elites of the Sasanian empire, whose conversion ratified their old privileges. With time, the weakening of non-Muslim elites facilitated the breakdown of old communal ties and reinforced the incentives of conversion which promised economic advantages and social mobility. By the beginning of the 8th century, conversions became a policy issue for the caliphate. They were favored by religious activists, and many Arabs accepted the equality of Arabs and non-Arabs. However, conversion was associated with economic and political advantages, and Muslim elites were reluctant to see their privileges diluted. Public policy towards converts varied depending on the region and was changed by successive Umayyad caliphs. These circumstances provoked opposition from non-Arab converts, whose ranks included many active soldiers, and helped set the stage for the civil war which ended with the fall of the Umayyad dynasty.

=== Taxation policies and conversions to Islam ===
The Arab-Muslim conquests followed a general pattern of nomadic conquests of settled regions, whereby the conquering peoples became the new military elite and reached a compromise with the old elites by allowing them to retain local political, religious, and financial authority. Peasants, workers, and merchants paid taxes, while members of the old and new elites collected them. Payment of taxes, which for peasants often reached half of the value of their produce, was an economic burden as well as a mark of social inferiority. Scholars differ in their assessment of relative tax burdens before and after the conquests. John Esposito states that in effect this meant lower taxes. According to Bernard Lewis, available evidence suggests that the change from Byzantine to Arab rule was "welcomed by many among the subject peoples, who found the new yoke far lighter than the old, both in taxation and in other matters". In contrast, Norman Stillman writes that although the tax burden of the Jews under early Islamic rule was comparable to that under previous rulers, Christians of the Byzantine Empire (though not Christians of the Persian empire, whose status was similar to that of the Jews) and Zoroastrians of Iran shouldered a considerably heavier burden in the immediate aftermath of the conquests.

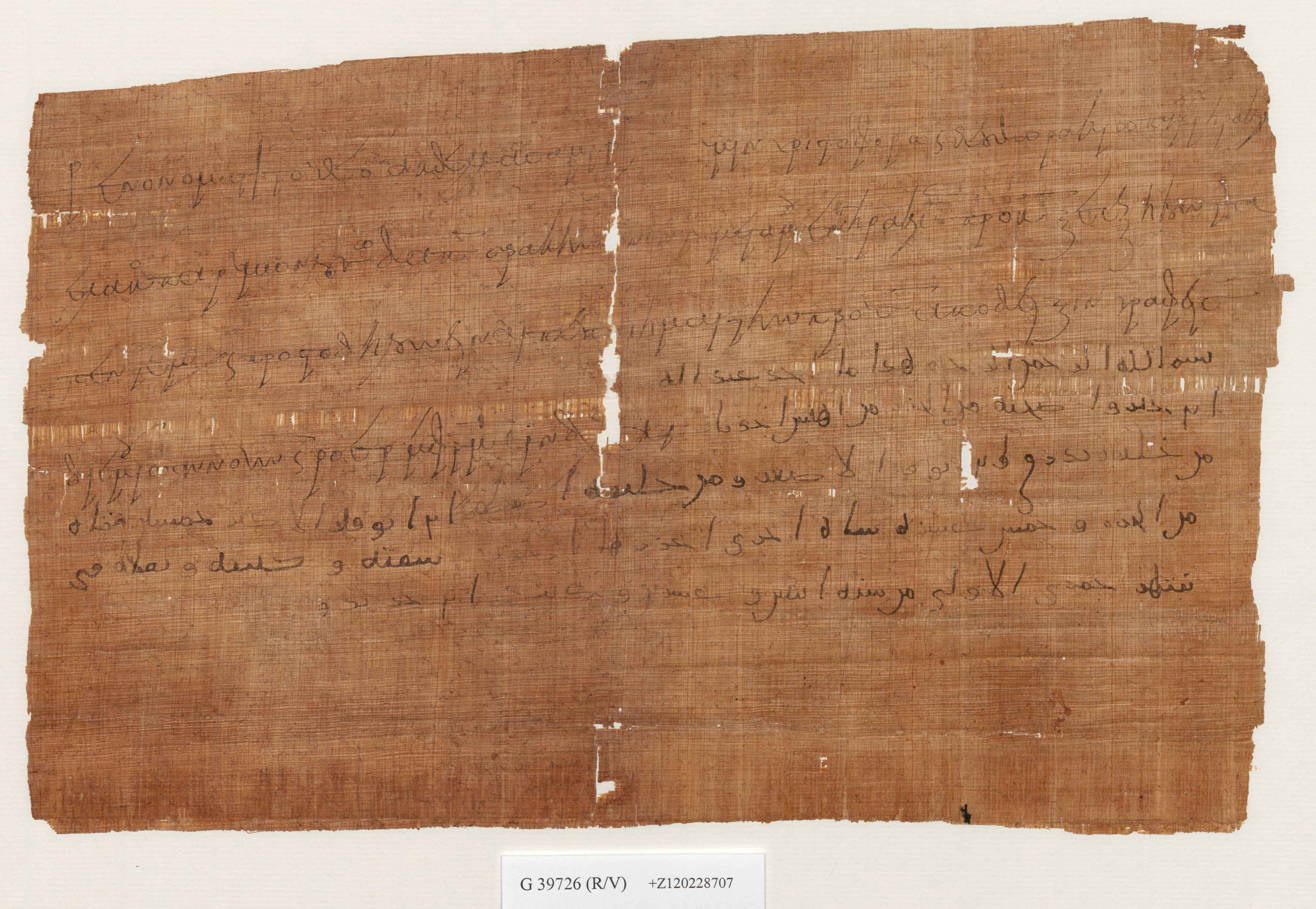
Egyptian papyrus PERF 558 containing a bilingual Greek-Arabic tax receipt dated from 643 AD

In the wake of the early conquests taxes could be levied on individuals, on the land, or as collective tribute. During the first century of Islamic expansion, the words jizya and kharaj were used in all three senses, with context distinguishing between individual and land taxes. Regional variations in taxation at first reflected the diversity of previous systems. The Sasanian Empire had a general tax on land and a poll tax having several rates based on wealth, with an exemption for aristocracy. This poll tax was adapted by Arab rulers, so that the aristocracy exemption was assumed by the new Arab-Muslim elite and shared by local aristocracy who converted to Islam. The nature of Byzantine taxation remains partly unclear, but it appears to have been levied as a collective tribute on population centers and this practice was generally followed under the Arab rule in former Byzantine provinces. Collection of taxes was delegated to autonomous local communities on the condition that the burden be divided among its members in the most equitable manner. In most of Iran and Central Asia local rulers paid a fixed tribute and maintained their autonomy in tax collection.

==== Tax evasion and reforms ====
Difficulties in tax collection soon appeared. Egyptian Copts, who had been skilled in tax evasion since Roman times, were able to avoid paying the taxes by entering monasteries, which were initially exempt from taxation, or simply by leaving the district where they were registered. This prompted imposition of taxes on monks and introduction of movement controls. In Iraq, many peasants who had fallen behind with their tax payments converted to Islam and abandoned their land for Arab garrison towns in hope of escaping taxation. Faced with a decline in agriculture and a treasury shortfall, the governor of Iraq, al-Hajjaj ibn Yusuf, forced peasant converts to return to their lands and subjected them to the taxes again, effectively forbidding them from converting to Islam. In Khorasan, a similar phenomenon forced the native aristocracy to compensate for the shortfall in tax collection out of their own pockets, and they responded by persecuting peasant converts and imposing heavier taxes on poor Muslims.

The situation where conversion to Islam was penalized in an Islamic state could not last, and the Umayyad caliph Umar ibn Abd al-Aziz (r. 717–720) has been credited with changing the taxation system. Modern historians doubt this account, although details of the transition to the system of taxation elaborated by Abbasid-era jurists are unclear. Umar II ordered governors to cease collection of taxes from Muslim converts, but his successors obstructed this policy and some governors sought to stem the tide of conversions by introducing additional requirements such as circumcision and the ability to recite passages from the Quran. Taxation-related grievances of non-Arab Muslims contributed to the opposition movements which resulted in the Abbasid Revolution. Under the new system that was eventually established, kharaj came to be regarded as a tax levied on the land, regardless of the taxpayer's religion. The poll-tax was no longer levied on Muslims, but the treasury did not necessarily suffer and converts did not gain as a result, since they had to pay zakat, which was probably instituted as a compulsory tax on Muslims around 730. The terminology became specialized during the Abbasid era, so that kharaj no longer meant anything more than land tax, while the term jizya was restricted to the poll-tax on dhimmis.

The influence of jizya on conversion has been a subject of scholarly debate. Julius Wellhausen holds that the poll tax amounted to so little that exemption from it did not constitute sufficient economic motive for conversion. Similarly, Thomas Arnold states that jizya was "too moderate" to constitute a burden, "seeing that it released them from the compulsory military service that was incumbent on their Muslim fellow subjects." He further adds that converts escaping taxation would have to pay the legal alms, zakat, that is annually levied on most kinds of movable and immovable property. Daniel Dennett has shown that other factors, such as desire to retain social status, had greater influence on this choice in the early Islamic period.

=== Sharia and non-Muslims ===
The Arab conquerors did not repeat the mistakes which had been made by the governments of the Byzantine and Sasanian empires, which had tried and failed to impose an official religion on subject populations, which had caused resentments that made the Muslim conquests more acceptable to them. Instead, the rulers of the new empire generally respected the traditional middle-Eastern pattern of religious pluralism, which was not one of equality but rather of dominance by one group over the others. After the end of military operations, which involved sacking of some monasteries and confiscation of Zoroastrian fire temples in Syria and Iraq, the early caliphate was characterized by religious tolerance and peoples of all ethnicities and religions blended in public life. According to Lapidus, before Muslims were ready to build mosques in Syria, they accepted Christian churches as holy places and shared them with local Christians. He states that in Iraq and Egypt, Muslim authorities cooperated with Christian religious leaders, and that numerous churches were repaired and new ones built during the Umayyad era.

According to Hoyland, the first Umayyad caliph Mu'awiya I made deliberate efforts to convince those whom he had conquered that he was not opposed to their religion, and tried to enlist support from Christian Arab elites. He even goes further and claims that there is no evidence for public display of Islam by the state before the reign of Caliph Abd al-Malik (685–705), when Quranic verses and references to Muhammad suddenly became prominent on coins and official documents. He suggests that this change was motivated by a desire to unify the Islamic community after the second Muslim civil war and rally them against their chief common enemy, the Byzantine Empire.

A further change of policy occurred during the reign of Umar II (717–720). The disastrous failure of the siege of Constantinople in 718 which was accompanied by massive Arab casualties led to a spike of popular animosity among Muslims toward Byzantium and Christians in general. At the same time, many Arab soldiers left the army for civilian occupations and they wished to emphasize their high social status among the conquered peoples. These events prompted introduction of restrictions on non-Muslims, which, according to Hoyland, were modeled both on Byzantine curbs on Jews, starting with the Theodosian Code and later codes, which contained prohibitions against building new synagogues and giving testimony against Christians, and on Sassanid regulations that prescribed distinctive attire for different social classes.

In the following decades Islamic jurists elaborated a legal framework in which other religions would have a protected but subordinate status. Islamic law followed the Byzantine precedent of classifying subjects of the state according to their religion, in contrast to the Sasanian model which put more weight on social than on religious distinctions. In theory, like the Byzantine empire, the caliphate placed severe restrictions on paganism, but in practice most non-Abrahamic communities of the former Sasanian territories were classified as possessors of a scripture (ahl al-kitab) and granted protected (dhimmi) status.

==== Jews and Christians ====
In Islam, Christians and Jews are seen as "People of the Book" as the Muslims accept both Jesus Christ and the Jewish prophets as their own prophets, which accorded them a respect that was not reserved to the "heathen" peoples of Iran, Central Asia and India. In places like the Levant and Egypt, both Christians and Jews were allowed to maintain their churches and synagogues and keep their own religious organizations in exchange for paying the jizya tax. At times, the caliphs engaged in triumphalist gestures, like building the famous Dome of the Rock in Jerusalem from 690 to 692 on the site of the Jewish Second Temple, which had been destroyed by the Romans in 70 AD—though the use of Roman and Sassanian symbols of power in the mosque suggests its purpose was partly to celebrate the Arab victories over the two empires.

Those Christians out of favor with the prevailing orthodoxy in the Roman Empire often preferred to live under Muslim rule as it meant the end of persecution. As both the Jewish and Christian communities of the Levant and North Africa were better educated than their conquerors, they were often employed as civil servants in the early years of the caliphate. However, a reported saying of Muhammad that "Two religions may not dwell together in Arabia" led to different policies being pursued in Arabia with conversion to Islam being imposed rather than merely encouraged. With the notable exception of Yemen, where a large Jewish community existed right up until the middle of the 20th century, all of the Christian and Jewish communities in Arabia "completely disappeared". The Jewish community of Yemen seems to have survived as Yemen was not regarded as part of Arabia proper in the same way that the Hejaz and the Nejd were.

Mark R. Cohen writes that the jizya paid by Jews under Islamic rule provided a "surer guarantee of protection from non-Jewish hostility" than that possessed by Jews in the Latin West, where Jews "paid numerous and often unreasonably high and arbitrary taxes" in return for official protection, and where treatment of Jews was governed by charters which new rulers could alter at will upon accession or refuse to renew altogether. The Pact of Umar, which stipulated that Muslims must "do battle to guard" the dhimmis and "put no burden on them greater than they can bear", was not always upheld, but it remained "a steadfast cornerstone of Islamic policy" into early modern times.

Some Persian Zoroastrians, now known as Parsees, fled to India to continue to follow the pre-Islamic traditions and religion of their homeland safely.

== See also ==
- Ghazi
- Islam and war
- Islam in Europe
- History of Islam
- Spread of Islam
- Pre-modern human migration
- Historiography of early Islam
