= Siege of Caesarea =

Siege of Caesarea may refer to:

- Siege of Caesarea in Cappadocia (260), Sasanians capture the city from the Romans
- Siege of Caesarea (611–612), Byzantines capture the city from the Sasanians
- Siege of Caesarea Maritima (614), Sasanians capture the city from the Byzantine empire
- Conquest of Caesarea Maritima (634–641), Muslims capture the city from the Byzantine empire
- Siege of Caesarea Maritima (1101), Crusaders capture the city from the Fatimids
- Siege of Caesarea Maritima (1265), Mamluks capture the city from the Crusaders

== See also ==
- Battle of Caesarea (disambiguation)
