= Battle of Caesarea =

Battle of Caesarea may refer to:

- Battle of Caesarea (654)
- Battle of Caesarea (781)
- Battle of Caesarea (1073)

== See also ==
- Siege of Caesarea
