= Abu al-A'war =

Arab military commander

Governor of Jordan
- In office 650s–660s
- Monarch: Mu'awiya I

Personal details
- Born: Hejaz, Arabia
- Children: Sufyan
- Parent: Sufyan ibn Abd Shams (father)
- Relatives: Ubayda ibn Abd al-Rahman (nephew or great-grandson)

Military service
- Allegiance: Pagan Arab tribes (pre-630); Rashidun Caliphate (632–656); Mu'awiya I (656–661); Umayyad Caliphate (661–death)
- Battles/wars: Battle of Hunayn; Muslim conquest of the Levant; Battle of the Yarmuk; Arab–Byzantine wars; Muslim conquest of Cyprus; Battle of the Masts; First Fitna; Battle of Siffin; Umayyad invasions of Egypt

Abu al-A'war Amr ibn Sufyan ibn Abd Shams al-Sulami (Arabic: أبو الأعور عمرو بن سُفيان بن عبد شمس السلمي, romanized: ʾAbū al-ʾAʿwar ʿAmr ibn Sufyān ibn ʿAbd Shams al-Sulamī), identified with the Abulathar or Aboubacharos (Greek: Ἀβουλαθάρ, Ἀβουβάχαρος) of the Byzantine sources (fl. 629–669), was an Arab admiral and general, serving in the armies of caliphs Abu Bakr (r. 632–634), Umar (r. 634–644), Uthman (r. 644–656), and Mu'awiya I (r. 661–680).

He was one of the last prominent members of the Banu Sulaym tribe to convert to Islam, and fought against Muhammad at the Battle of Hunayn in 630. After becoming a Muslim, he took part in the conquest of Syria in the 630s and fought at the Yarmuk. Later, he commanded the Arab navy during the campaigns against the Byzantines in the eastern Mediterranean, including the decisive Muslim victory at the Battle of the Masts in 654. His army was also allegedly responsible for the destruction of the colossus of Rhodes. From the First Fitna until his disappearance from the historical record in the 660s, Abu al-A'war served Mu'awiya in a number of capacities, including as a commander and negotiator at the Battle of Siffin against Caliph Ali (r. 656–661), an operative of Amr ibn al-As in the Umayyad conquest of Egypt, a tax administrator in Palestine and the governor of Jordan; he had held the latter post since the reign of Uthman.

== Early life and career ==
Abu al-A'war's given name was Amr. His father was Sufyan ibn Abd Shams, a chieftain of the prominent Dhakwan clan of the Banu Sulaym, a nomadic Arab tribe that dominated the Harra region in the north-central Hejaz (in present-day western Saudi Arabia) and had strong links to Medina and Mecca. Abu al-A'war's mother and grandmother both belonged to the Quraysh tribe of Mecca. His father Sufyan commanded the Sulaym when they fought alongside the Quraysh against Muhammad and the early Muslims at the Battle of the Trench in 627 CE.

Although most of the Sulaym converted to Islam by 629, Abu al-A'war, who was a confederate of the Qurayshi leader Abu Sufyan, proved an exception and fought against the Muslims at the Battle of Hunayn that year. Abu al-A'war ultimately converted to Islam, though his status as a ṣaḥāba (companion of Muhammad) is disputed by Muslim scholars. Indeed, the highly authoritative Muslim scholar Muhammad al-Bukhari does not mention Abu al-A'war in his list of ṣaḥāba.

== Campaigns against the Byzantines ==
Abu al-A'war was likely part of the army of Yazid ibn Abi Sufyan dispatched by Caliph Abu Bakr (r. 632–634) to conquer Byzantine Syria. He commanded a detachment of Yazid's forces at the Battle of the Yarmuk, during which the Byzantines were routed and much of Syria was annexed by the growing Rashidun Caliphate. His relationship with Yazid and his father Abu Sufyan helped establish his enduring loyalty to their Umayyad clan throughout his career. Under the direction of Mu'awiya ibn Abi Sufyan, Yazid's brother and the governor of Syria, Abu al-A'war and Wahb ibn Umayr, led a raid against the Byzantine city of Amorion in 644; this marked the start of both strategic and marauding Muslim military campaigns into Byzantine Anatolia.

He commanded the second Arab raid against Cyprus, which probably took place in summer 650. The Arabs besieged the town of Lapithos, but abandoned the siege after the inhabitants paid a large sum of money. It appears that the Arabs did not evacuate the island entirely, however, and that Abu al-A'war erected a fortress with a garrison of 12,000 men, who according to the Arabic sources remained on the island until the peace treaty of 680, following the failure of the First Arab Siege of Constantinople. Abu al-A'war seems to have commanded this garrison for some time, since the 10th-century Byzantine emperor Constantine VII records that the Arab "Aboubacharos"—who is likely to be identified with Abu al-A'war—erected a tomb for his daughter, who died there, which survived to Constantine's day.

According to Michael the Syrian, shortly after this, in 653/654, Abu al-A'war commanded an expedition against Kos, which was captured and plundered due to the treason of the local bishop. He proceeded to pillage Crete and Rhodes. The latter was a major commercial island and its capture was a major loss to the Byzantines. During the pillaging of Rhodes, Abu al-A'war's troops leveled the Colossus of Rhodes, a well-known statue of the Greek god Helios. Finally in 654 he commanded the Arab fleet in the great Battle of the Masts, where the Byzantine navy under Emperor Constans II was annihilated. According to Armenian and Byzantine sources, his fleet continued onward to besiege Constantinople but a storm destroyed the ships carrying siege engines. This loss is absent from Arabic chronicles.

== Service with Mu'awiya ==
Caliph Uthman (r. 644–656), who belonged to the Umayyad clan, appointed Abu al-A'war as governor of Jund al-Urdunn (military district of Jordan) with its capital in Tiberias. During the First Fitna, which followed the assassination of Uthman, Abu al-A'war served as one of Mu'awiya's generals in the battles against Caliph Ali (r. 656–661). He commanded a Sulaymi contingent at the Battle of Siffin in 657. Following the fighting at Siffin, Abu al-A'war was one Mu'awiya's representatives in the settlement negotiations with Ali, and he prepared the preliminary draft for the caliphal succession conference in Adhruh, a town in the Sharat highlands. In 658/59, Mu'awiya confirmed Abu al-A'war in his post in Jordan.

Later, Abu al-A'war assisted Amr ibn al-As with asserting Mu'awiya's authority over Egypt. After Mu'awiya succeeded Ali in 661 and established the Umayyad Caliphate, he intended to replace Amr, his independent-minded governor in Egypt, with Abu al-A'war, but this plan never came to fruition. Instead, Abu al-A'war was kept as governor of Jordan. According to Michael the Syrian, in 669, Abu al-A'war oversaw the census of the fellāḥīn (peasantry) of Jund Filastin (military district of Palestine), and thereby introduced the system of taxation imposed on the Christian villages of Palestine.

== Legacy ==
On account of his services for Mu'awiya, medieval Muslim historians regarded Abu al-A'war as one of Mu'awiya's senior lieutenants and part of the latter's biṭāna (inner circle). Abu al-A'war disappears from the historical record before the end of Mu'awiya's reign in 680. During his lifetime, his son Sufyan was a military chief of the Arab tribes in Jordan. His nephew or great-grandson, Ubayda ibn Abd al-Rahman, served as the provincial governor of Azerbaijan, Jordan, and Ifriqiya during the reigns of Umayyad caliphs Umar II (r. 717–720) Hisham (r. 724–743) and al-Walid II (r. 743–744), respectively.

== Sources ==
- Blankinship, Khalid Yahya, ed. (1993). The History of al-Ṭabarī, Volume XI: The Challenge to the Empires. SUNY Series in Near Eastern Studies. Albany, New York: State University of New York Press. ISBN 978-0-7914-0851-3.
- Gil, Moshe (1997) [1983]. A History of Palestine, 634–1099. Translated by Ethel Broido. Cambridge: Cambridge University Press. ISBN 0-521-59984-9.
- Kaegi, Walter E. (1992). Byzantium and the Early Islamic Conquests. Cambridge University Press. ISBN 0-521-41172-6.
- Lammens, H. (1960). "Abu 'l- Aʿwar ʿAmr b. Sufyān al-Sulamī". In Gibb, H. A. R.; Kramers, J. H.; Lévi-Provençal, E.; Schacht, J.; Lewis, B. & Pellat, Ch. (eds.). The Encyclopaedia of Islam, Second Edition. Volume I: A–B. Leiden: E. J. Brill. p. 108. OCLC 495469456.
- Lecker, M. (1997). "Sulaym". In Bosworth, C. E.; van Donzel, E.; Heinrichs, W. P. & Lecomte, G. (eds.). The Encyclopaedia of Islam, Second Edition. Volume IX: San–Sze. Leiden: E. J. Brill. pp. 817–818. ISBN 978-90-04-10422-8.
- Lilie, Ralph-Johannes; Ludwig, Claudia; Pratsch, Thomas; Zielke, Beate (1998–2013). Prosopographie der mittelbyzantinischen Zeit (in German). Berlin and Boston: De Gruyter.
- Hoyland, Robert G. (2014). In God's Path: The Arab Conquests and the Creation of an Islamic Empire. Oxford University Press. ISBN 9780199916368.
