= Battle of the Masts =

655 naval battle of the Arab–Byzantine wars

- Part of the Arab–Byzantine wars
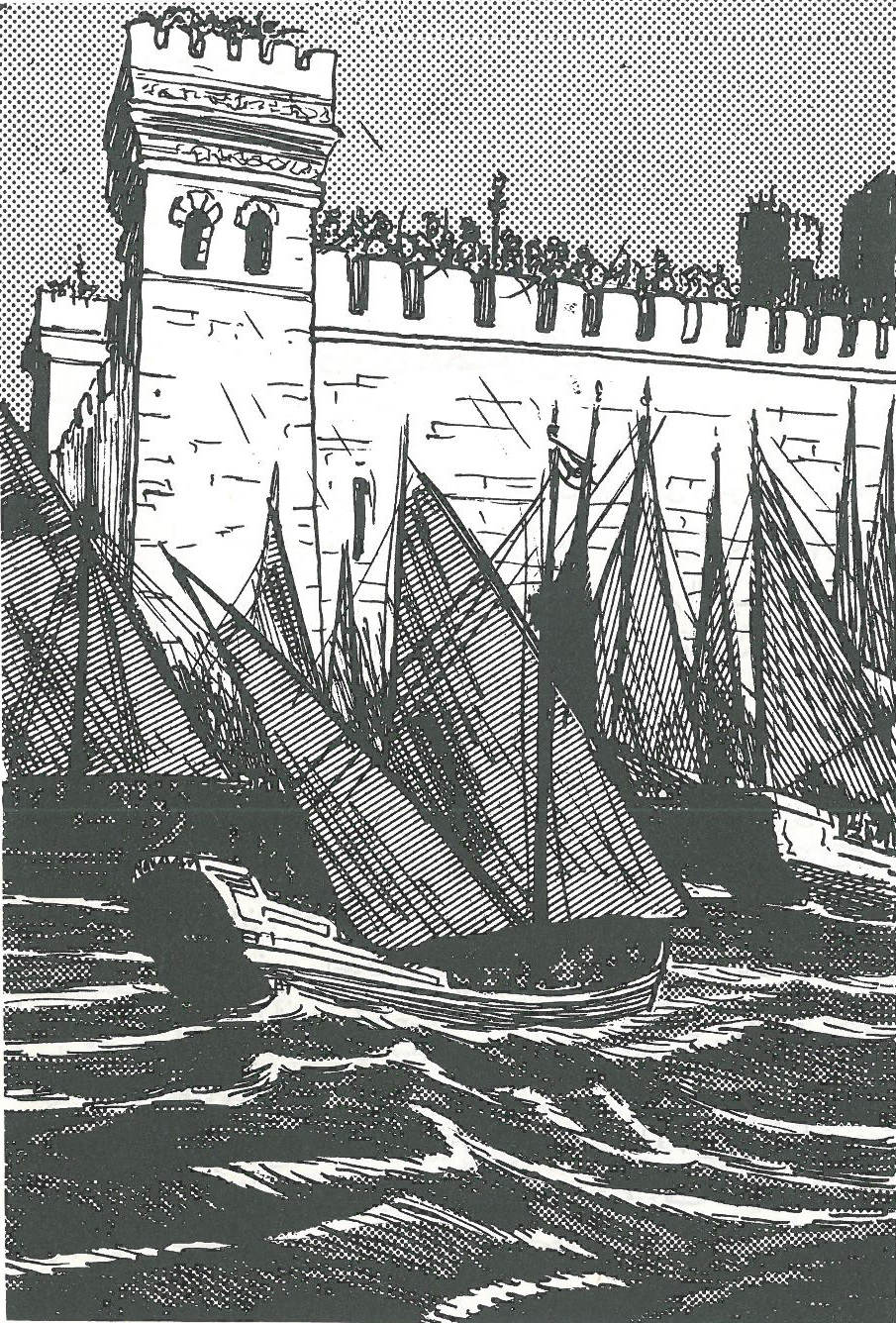
- The Battle of the Masts, as portrayed in Tārīkhunā bi-uslūb qaṣaṣī (Our History in a Narrative style), published 1935
Date	654/655 (Note: Al-Tabari records two possible dates for this naval battle: 651–652 (A.H. 31) on the authority of al-Waqidi and 654–655 (A.H. 34) on the authority of Abu Ma'shar al-Sindi. The chronicles of the Armenian Sebeos and Byzantine Theophanes concur with the latter date.)
Location	Off the Lycian coast at Phoenice, Anatolia, Mediterranean Sea (modern-day Finike) 36.281898°N 30.260732°E
Result	Rashidun victory

Belligerents
Rashidun Caliphate	Byzantine Empire

Commanders and leaders
Muʿāwiya ibn Abī Sufyān; Abu al-A'war; Abd Allah ibn Sa'd	Constans II

Strength
200 ships	500 ships 1,000 ships (per Theophanes)

Casualties and losses
heavy	Almost all

The Battle of the Masts (Arabic: مَعْرَكَة ذَات الصَّوَارِي, romanized: Maʿrakat Dhāt al-Ṣawārī) was a naval battle fought in 655 between the Byzantine Empire led by Emperor Constans II (r. 641–668), and the Rashidun Caliphate under the command of Abu al-A'war, admiral of Mu'awiya, the governor of Syria.

The battle was part of the earliest campaign by Mu'awiya to reach Constantinople, the Byzantine capital, and is considered to be "the first decisive conflict of Islam on the deep".

== Background ==
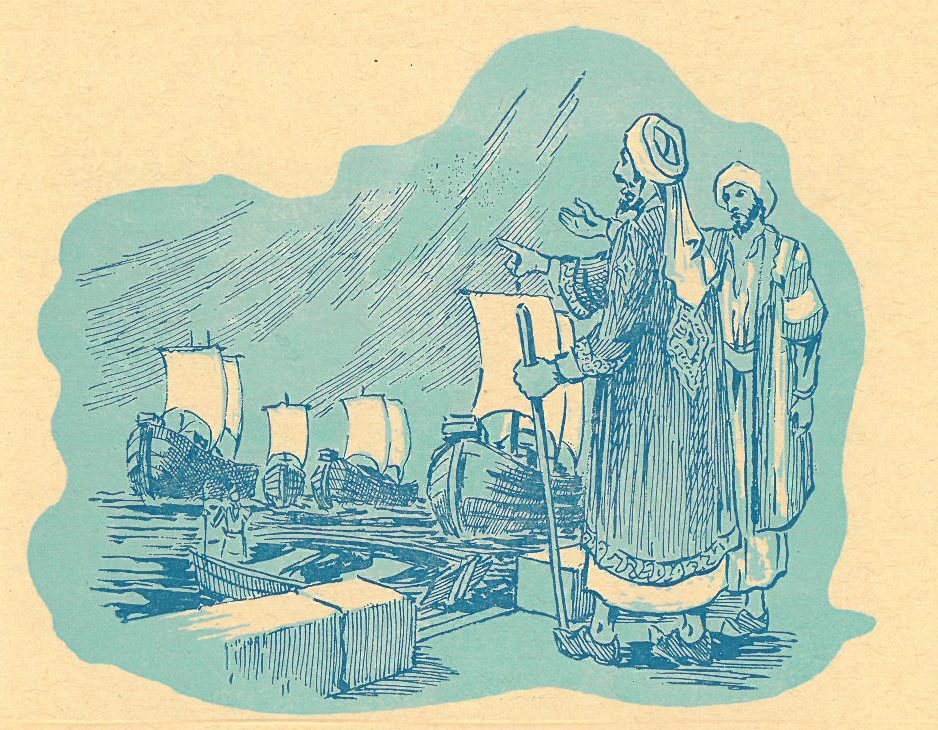
The Muslim fleet departs before the Battle of the Masts, as depicted in Tareekh Al-Islam Al-Musawwar (published 1964).

In the 650s the Rashidun Caliphate completed its conquest of the Sasanian Empire and continued its successful expansion into the territories of the Byzantine Empire. In 645, Abd Allah ibn Sa'd was appointed as the governor of Egypt by Caliph Uthman, replacing the semi-independent 'Amr ibn al-'As. Uthman permitted his governor of Syria, Mu'awiya ibn Abi Sufyan, to raid the island of Cyprus in 649 and the success of that campaign set the stage for the undertaking of naval activities by the governor of Egypt. Abd Allah ibn Sa'd built a strong navy and proved to be a skilled naval commander. Under him the Muslim navy won a number of naval victories including repulsing a Byzantine counterattack on Alexandria in 646.

In 654, Mu'awiya undertook a military expedition to Cappadocia while his fleet, under the command of Abu al-A'war, advanced along the southern coast of Anatolia. Emperor Constans embarked against it with a large fleet.

== Battle ==
The two forces met off the coast of Mount Phoenix in Lycia, near the harbour of Phoenix (modern Finike). According to the 9th century Byzantine chronicler Theophanes the Confessor, as the Emperor was preparing for battle, on the previous night he dreamt that he was in Thessalonica; awaking he related the dream to an interpreter of dreams who said: Emperor, would that you had not slept nor seen that dream for your presence in Thessalonica – according to the interpreter, victory inclined to the Emperor's foes. The interpreter interpreted the dream this way because Θεσσαλονίκη ("Thessaloniki") sounds similar to the words 'δές άλλω νίκη' (thes allo nike), which mean 'give victory to another'.

Due to the rough seas, al-Tabari describes the Byzantine and Arab ships being arranged in lines and lashed together, to allow for melee combat. The Arabs were victorious in battle, although losses were heavy for both sides, and Constans barely escaped to Constantinople. According to Theophanes, he made his escape by exchanging uniforms with one of his officers.

== Siege of Constantinople in 655 ==
Following their defeat, the respite the Romans were granted is typically ascribed to the Arab fleet retreating after its victory amidst conflict over the authority of Caliph Uthman among the crew, the first stirrings of a civil war among the Muslims. No further naval attacks on this expedition are recorded in traditional Arabic sources.

However, the Armenian historian Sebeos records that the Arab fleet continued on beyond the battle at Phoenix to attempt a siege of Constantinople. The siege was unsuccessful, however, due to a fierce storm that sank the ships with war machines aboard, an event the Romans attributed to divine intervention. The land force led by Mu'awiya to Chalcedon, having lost their artillery and siege engines, returned to Syria thereafter. Similarly, Ibn Kathir mentions that Mu'awiya advanced up to Chrysopolis around the same year.

Muslim sources do not usually mention this event, but it corresponds to notices in other Christian histories of the eastern Mediterranean, such as the chronicle of Theophanes. It suggests the early 650s invasions of Rhodes, Cyprus, and Asia Minor were preparatory to a full-scale assault on the walls of Constantinople. Also, it provides a strategic explanation for the Arab fleet's retreat following their victory, since the First Fitna would not break out until a year later, perhaps influenced by setbacks against the Byzantines and in the Caucasus.

== Aftermath ==
Both the Rashidun and Roman fleets endured major casualties. Nonetheless, the Muslim victory was a significant event in the naval history of the Mediterranean Sea. From long being considered a 'Roman lake', the Mediterranean became a focus of contention between the naval might of the rising Caliphate and the Eastern Roman Empire.

This conflict would continue over the subsequent decades, with Muslims using their supremacy in the Mediterranean to go as far as Sicily and establish strongholds in Western Europe. The victory also paved the way for uncontested Muslim expansion along the coastline of North Africa.

== See also ==
- Early Caliphate navy
