= Siege of Caesarea Maritima (1101) =

- Part of the Crusades
Date	2–17 May 1101
Location	Caesarea Maritima, Levant
Result	Crusader victory
Territorial changes	Lordship of Caesarea was created

Belligerents
Kingdom of Jerusalem; Republic of Genoa	Fatimid Caliphate

Commanders and leaders
Baldwin I of Jerusalem; Guglielmo Embriaco	Governor of Caesarea (POW)

Strength
Unknown number of Crusaders; 8,000 Genoese	Unknown

Casualties and losses
Unknown	Heavy, defenders and civilians massacred

The Siege of Caesarea Maritima was a military engagement between the Crusader forces allied with the Genoese navy and the Fatimid garrison of Caesarea Maritima. The Crusader forces led by King Baldwin I of Jerusalem captured the city after two weeks of siege.

== Background ==
The capture of Jerusalem by the Crusaders was a great victory. However, without the control of the coastal cities, it would be impossible to hold on to Jerusalem for a long time. Although victorious at the battle of Ascalon, the Crusaders failed to capture Ascalon. The newly formed Kingdom of Jerusalem lacked manpower and was plagued by diseases. In the year 1101, the Genoese arrived in Jaffa with a fleet carrying 8,000 men. They made a pilgrimage to Jerusalem. The Genoese were a boost to the Crusaders. King Baldwin I of Jerusalem made a deal with them to assist him in his conquests in exchange for a third share of booty taken and a semi-independent trading enclave. They agreed, and together they managed to capture Arsuf on April 29, which surrendered.

== Siege ==
Afterwards, the Crusader-Genoese force marched to Caesarea Maritima on May 2nd. The Genoese rowed their fleet to the shore and disembarked, ravaging the city suburbs. The Genoese began constructing siege engines and wooden castles for the siege. Baldwin dispatched a message to the Fatimid garrison, urging them to surrender or suffer a brutal siege. They refused, hoping that fresh reinforcements would arrive. Caesarea possessed strong walls. The Crusaders began bombarding the walls with mangonels. The Fatimid garrison put up a fierce resistance for 15 days. The Genoese, led by Guglielmo Embriaco, assaulted one of the towers with a Muslim collaborator. With this, the Crusader assaulted the walls using ladders and successfully entered the city. The Crusaders then unleashed a brutal sack, entering every street and house, massacring its male population, and enslaving women and children. A group of Muslim merchants found refuge in the mosque. The Crusaders spared their lives after ransoming themselves. The Crusaders acquired a great amount of loot. One Latin observer wrote:

How much property of various kinds was found there it is impossible to say, but many of our men who had been poor became rich. I saw a great many of the Saracens who were killed there put in a pile and burned. The fetid odour of their bodies bothered us greatly. These wretches were burned for the sake of finding the gold coins which some had swallowed.

The Genoese distributed their loot among themselves; each soldier received 48 solidi and two pounds of valuable spices. Baldwin spared the emir of Caesarea and its judge, hoping to secure a large ransom. The conquest was completed on May 17th.

== Aftermath ==
Baldwin would continue in his conquests. In 1103 and 1104, he besieged and secured the important coastal town of Acre.

== Sources ==
- Peter Fraser Purton (2009), A History of the Early Medieval Siege, C. 450-1220.
- Thomas Asbridge (2012), The Crusades, The War for the Holy Land.
- Gil Fishhof & Judith Bronstein & Vardit Shotten-Hallel (2021), Settlement and Crusade in the Thirteenth Century, Multidisciplinary Studies of the Latin East.
