= Battle of Caesarea (654) =

Battle of the Arab-Byzantine wars

- Part of the Arab–Byzantine wars
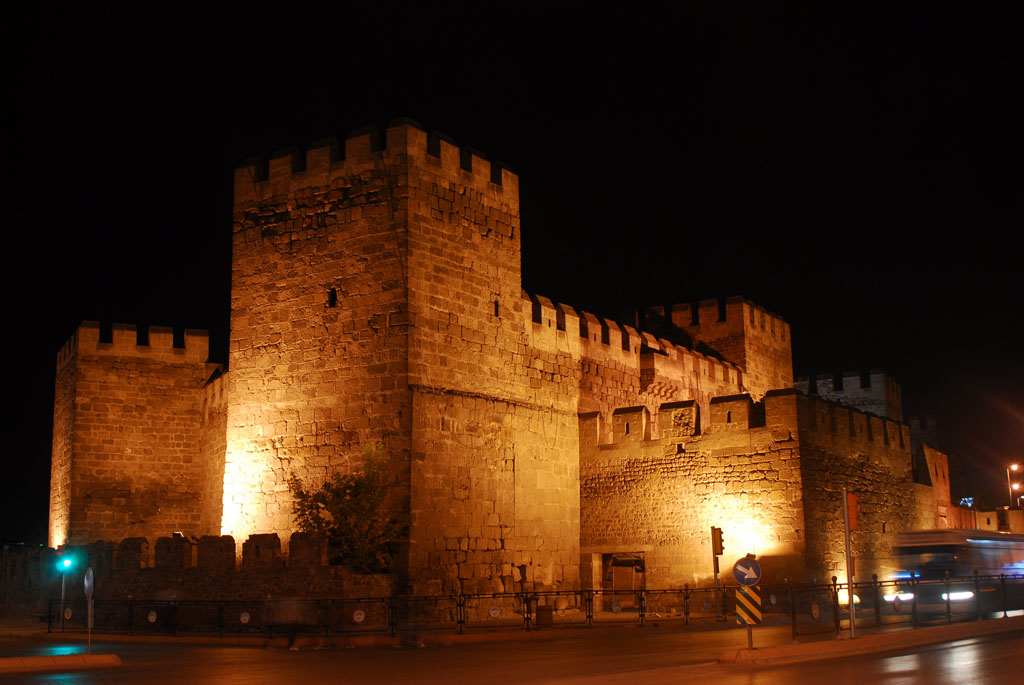
- Modern view of the Kayseri Castle, originally constructed by the Byzantines in the 6th century
Date	Summer 654 or 655 AD (Note: Reconstructions of the campaign vary between scholars placing trust in Sebeos' account and those who do not. Older scholarly reconstructions such as those of Warren Treadgold or Ralph-Johannes Lilie dismiss Sebeos account of a Rashidun maritime attack against Constantinople, following the Chronographia of Theophanes the Confessor in placing the Rashidun attack against Caesarea as being simultaneous with the battle of the Masts in 655. More recent analyses by Shaun O'Sullivan and Robert G. Hoyland reason that such a naval operation as described by Sebeos is likely to have occurred. However, O'Sullivan places the destruction of the Rashidun Armada by the storm before the battle of the Masts, while Hoyland proposes that the attack on Constantinople occurred after the naval defeat of Constans II, rationalizing this as an Arab attempt to exploit their victory. However, both Hoyland and O'Sullivan date the attack on Constantinople and the battle of Caesarea to 654.)
Location	Caesarea (modern Kayseri), Cappadocia
Result	Byzantine victory

Belligerents
Byzantine Empire	Rashidun Caliphate

Commanders and leaders
Constans II	Mu'awiya ibn Abi Sufyan

Strength
Fewer than 100,000	300,000 (according to Sebeos, exaggerated)

The Battle of Caesarea was fought in the 650s during a grand offensive conducted against the Byzantine Empire by the Rashidun Caliphate, under the command of Mu'awiya, the governor of Syria. While the nascent Arab navy embarked on an ambitious attack against Constantinople, a large army was directed by Mu'awiya to conduct a supplementary attack against Byzantine holdings by land. Arab forces enjoyed initial success in restoring authority over Armenia, and subsequently continued the attack into Cappadocia. There, the Arabs were confronted by a Byzantine army, probably in the vicinity of Caesarea, and were eventually defeated. Coupled with a maritime disaster suffered by the Arab naval expedition in a storm on the Bosphorus, the defeat thwarted the invasion and marked a rare but significant Byzantine victory over the Arabs during the Rashidun era.

== Background ==
The Byzantine Empire and the Rashidun Caliphate in 650

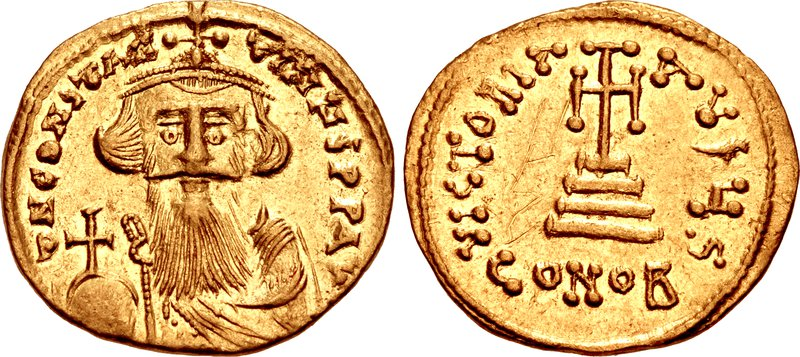
Solidus depicting Byzantine Emperor Constans II, c. 651–654

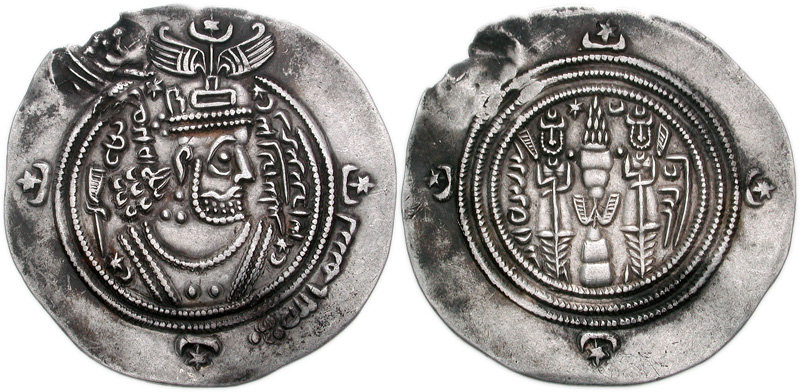
Sasanian-inspired silver dirham depicting the future Caliph Mu'awiya I

By the early 650s, the Arab–Byzantine wars had reached a critical strategic stalemate along the Taurus Mountains. Following the conquest of Syria and Egypt, the two powers contested strategic dominance over the Eastern Mediterranean, Anatolia and the Caucasus. In 653, Byzantine Emperor Constans II had used the preoccupation of Muslim forces with wars in Central Asia, Sindh and naval ventures on the Eastern Mediterranean, to launch an offensive of his own. He led an army of supposedly 100,000 men into Armenia, whose leading Nakharar Theodore Rshtuni had switched allegiance to the Arabs. Constans successfully reasserted Byzantine authority over the region and secured the submission of the Armenian powerbase at Dvin, but soon received reports of Arab designs on attacking Constantinople. Constans appointed a Byzantine commander named Maurianos with a small army to secure Armenia, and then hastily withdrew to Asia Minor with most of his army to prepare a defence against possible Arab attacks.

In 651, the Rashidun Caliphate had attained victory over the Sasanian Empire in the east, completing the Muslim conquest of Persia. With this success, Caliph Uthman endeavored to conduct a decisive campaign of expansion against the Byzantines, with Constans' campaign in Armenia adding further incentive. An immense quantity of veteran Arab warriors were detached from campaigning or garrisoning duties in Persia, Asoristan and even Sindh on the frontier with India, and sent west to congregate for a massive offensive against the Byzantines, led by Uthman's governor of Syria, Mu'awiya ibn Abi Sufyan. Additionally, the Caliphate's navy, which had developed in recent years and conducted several raiding operations, was tasked with its largest and most complex operation yet in preparing an attack against Constantinople. The Armenian historian Sebeos recorded that the Arabs assembled a fleet of 5,000 ships with 100 sailors and warriors in each, amounting to a total of 500,000, while the armies assembled to attack Asia Minor numbered 300,000, though these figures are grossly inflated.

== Campaign and battle ==
While a newly constructed Arab armada was prepared at Alexandria to contest Byzantine naval hegemony in the Mediterranean, a 7,000-strong Rashidun column was dispatched to Armenia to aid Theodore Rshtuni. Joined by Theodore's Armenian retinues, the Arab army forced the Byzantines to retreat to the Lazic coast. Rshtuni and his Arab allies then reoccupied Theodosiopolis, after which the Arabs plundered Byzantine territory along the Black Sea coast, capturing the city of Trebizond, before continuing their raid as far as the environs of Ancyra. Following the successful raid and restoration of Armenia under Arab hegemony, the main land army under Mu'awiya initiated its thrust into Anatolia, crossing the Cilician Gates. The primary objective of this land campaign was Caesarea. As the administrative capital, chief logistical hub, and intersection of major military roads in central Anatolia, the capture of Caesarea would grant the caliphate a forward base capable of severing Byzantine internal communications and staging a direct overland march to the Bosporus.

The Arab vanguard advanced rapidly into Cappadocia in early 654, catching the local Byzantine defensive garrisons unprepared. Mu'awiya appears to have occupied a strategic position at Caesarea, a possession of which would secure his logistical routes through the Central Anatolian plains. There, the Arab expedition divided into two armies, with one half remaining in Cappadocia, both to conduct further operations and to shield the other forces under Mu'awiya in their advance further to the west. Mu'awiya advanced as far as Chalcedon on the Bosphorus, as narrated by Sebeos, though some modern scholars doubt this claim. The land army was said to have rendezvoused with the Alexandrian armada, which had prepared various siege engines and artillery in anticipation of an assault on Constantinople. Mu'awiya then ordered the fleet to advance in two lines against the Byzantine capital, but as they drew near the city, a violent cyclone materialised, a development Sebeos attributed to divine intervention. The Arab vessels, encumbered by their siege engines, were capsized in the storm and lost, along with their crews and passengers. With his fleet destroyed, Mu'awiya and his army departed Asia Minor and withdrew to Syria.

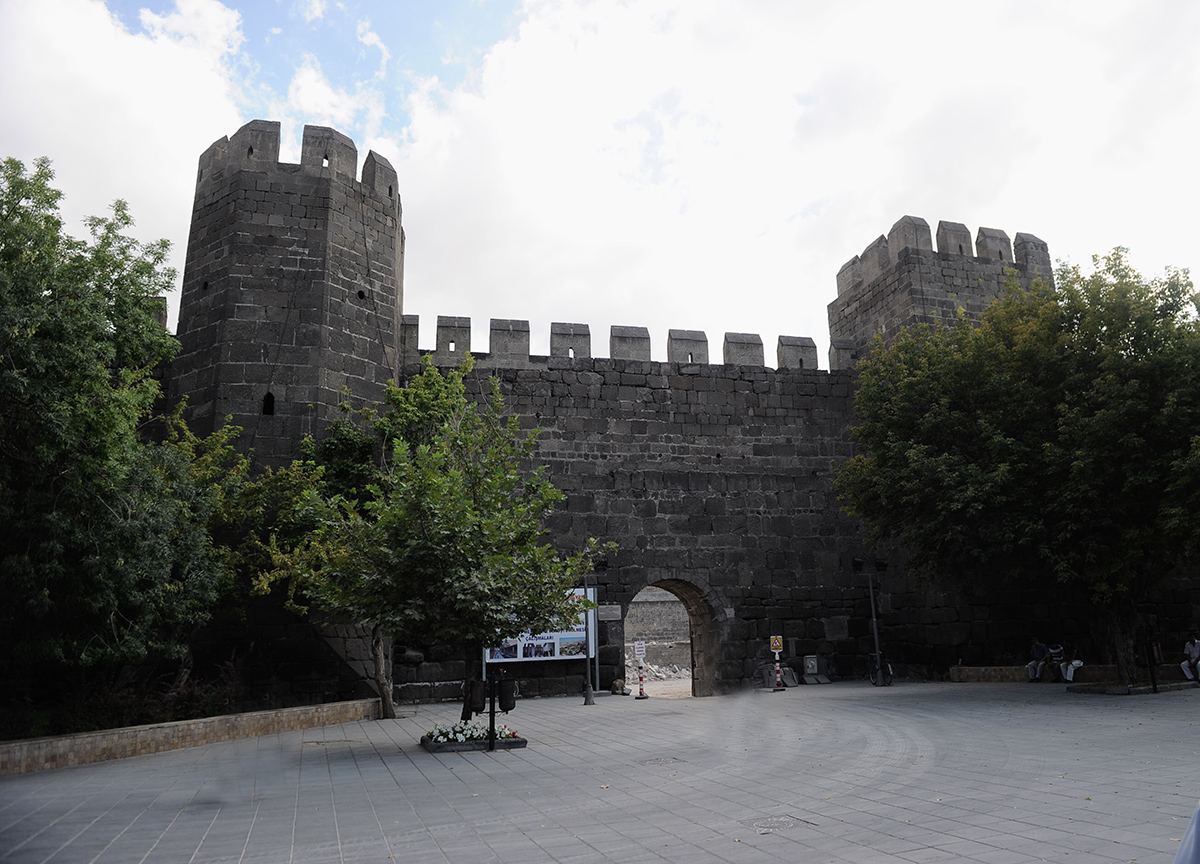
View of the entrance of Kayseri Castle

Seizing the strategic initiative following the destruction of the Arab fleet, a Byzantine army appears to have conducted a counter-offensive against the second Arab army in Cappadocia. The Byzantine forces advanced on Caesarea, but the Arabs launched a pre-emptive strike and attacked the Byzantines. In the fierce pitched battle that ensued, the Byzantine army emerged victorious. The Arabs were routed with significant casualties, and the survivors were forced to abandon their gains from the Cappadocian campaign and retreat from Byzantine territory. However, Mu'awiya's army had not been entirely destroyed, and inflicted some damage in pillaging Sophene during its retreat. Yet, the retreating Arab armies incurred further losses retreating through Armenia during late autumn, when Maurianos and his army advanced from the Black Sea coast to harass the Arabs, attacking and defeating Arab contingents in the cold weather and forcing the armies to cross the Araxes, until they reached safer territory around Lake Urmia. Maurianos exploited his success by attacking and sacking Dvin.

== Aftermath ==
The Byzantine victory at Caesarea and the catastrophic destruction of the Arab fleet averted the immediate threat to Anatolia by the Rashidun Caliphate, while providing a window of opportunity for the Byzantines to conduct their own offensives. Maurianos attempted to exploit his successes in 654, in order to restore Byzantine authority over the entirety of Armenia, but his subsequent siege of Nachkiwan was ultimately repulsed by the Arabs, with Maurianos himself falling in combat. Emperor Constans exploited the devastating losses sustained by the Muslim fleet during the storm to conduct a counteroffensive in Cyprus. This venture ultimately resulted in failure, when the depleted and outnumbered Muslim fleet achieved victory over the Byzantine navy at the Battle of the Masts. However, the heavy losses endured by the Muslim navy, both during their attempted attack on Constantinople and the Battle of the Masts itself, inhibited their ability to exploit this victory. The subsequent outbreak of the First Fitna in 656 prevented the Caliphate from conducting further grand strategic ventures against Byzantium, allowing Constans a period of reprieve and consolidation.

== Bibliography ==
- Hoyland, Robert G. (2014-01-01). In God's Path: The Arab Conquests and the Creation of an Islamic Empire. Oxford University Press. p. 107. ISBN 978-0-19-991636-8.
- Lilie, Ralph-Johannes (1976). Die byzantinische Reaktion auf die Ausbreitung der Araber. Studien zur Strukturwandlung des byzantinischen Staates im 7. und 8. Jhd [The Byzantine Response to the Spread of the Arabs. Studies on the structural change of the Byzantine state in the 7th and 8th centuries] (in German). Munich: Institut für Byzantinistik und Neugriechische Philologie der Universität München. OCLC 797598069.
- O'Sullivan, Shaun (2004-01-01). "Sebeos' account of an Arab attack on Constantinople in 654". Byzantine and Modern Greek Studies. 28 (1). doi:10.1179/byz.2004.28.1.67. ISSN 0307-0131. S2CID 161590308.
- Treadgold, Warren (1997). A History of the Byzantine State and Society. Stanford, California: Stanford University Press. ISBN 978-0804779371.
