= Muslim conquest of Cyprus =

649–650s conquest

- Part of the Arab–Byzantine wars
- Ancient Cyprus where some towns were attacked by Muslims.
Date	Spring 649 – 650/654
Location	Cyprus
Result	Rashidun victory

Belligerents
Rashidun Caliphate	Byzantine Empire

Commanders and leaders
Mu'awiya ibn Abi Sufyan; Abu al-A'war	Unknown

Strength
First Invasion: 1,700 ships Second invasion: 12,000 men 500 ships	Unknown

The Muslim conquest of Cyprus happened between 649 and 650 or 654, when two naval campaigns to subjugate the Byzantine island of Cyprus were launched by the Rashidun Caliphate, under the command of Mu'awiya, the governor of Syria. The campaigns proved to be successful, which placed Cyprus under Muslim control for three decades.

== Background ==
In the year 646, the Byzantines were at war with the Rashidun Caliphate, led by Caliph Uthman. The Byzantines launched a counterattack and captured Alexandria. From there the Byzantines marched inland but were defeated by the Muslims. After this victory, the Muslims realized that in order to protect their recent conquests, they would have to build a navy. Uthman's governor of Syria, Mu'awiya ibn Abi Sufyan, collected workers from Egypt and the Levant to construct a navy. After a work of three years, the Rashidun Caliphate was prepared to launch their first navy, with their eyes on the island of Cyprus.

== Conquest ==
Map of the main naval operations and battles between Muslims and Byzantines between the 7th and 11th centuries; Cyprus appears as a special region.

=== First invasion ===
In the spring of 649, the Muslims launched their first naval attack. Sailing from the coast of Syria was a naval force of 1,700 boats, which resembled a huge sailing forest. The Cypriots who were watching from the coast were alarmed by the large number of ships. The Muslim sailors stood on the top of the deck with their fighting gear and boasted about capturing Cyprus's wealthiest city. When the Muslims arrived near the coast, the flagship that carried Mu'awiya positioned itself at the head of the navy. He waited for any Cypriot to arrive and sue for peace. Time has passed and no one has arrived. The Muslims then dropped anchor and armed themselves.

The Muslim forces met no opposition. Mu'awiya headed for the capital, Constantia. Details of the siege are unknown, but the Muslims managed to subdue it. Mu'awyia placed his camp on the bishop's residence. The Muslims, scattered across the island, gained a large plunder, including gold, silver, clothing, and captives. Mu'awiya divided his loot between his Syrian and Egyptian contingents. Hearing of the approach of a Byzantine relief force, the Muslims quickly left the island with their loot.

The Cypriots were required to pay an annual tribute to the Muslims following this first successful raid. The island came under a sort of joint rule since they had already paid tribute to the Byzantines. Both sides received some money, but neither kept a permanent garrison.

=== Second invasion ===
In the year 650 or 654, the Muslims launched another attack. This time under the command of Abu al-A'war. The main reason for this attack was the news of the Byzantine relief force arriving in Cyprus. The Byzantines encouraged the inhabitants to resist and not panic. This was a clear violation to the Muslims, which broke the terms of the treaty. The Muslim navy is said to have consisted of 500 ships and carried a force of 12,000 regular soldiers. The Byzantine troops and native forces prepared to fight the upcoming Arab attack, but when they saw the Muslim navy on the horizon and their large number, they quickly abandoned the effort to resist.

The Byzantine and rich natives escaped the island, while others escaped to Lapathos. The Muslims landed and roamed freely on the island in search of plunder. The general went to Constantia and captured it. Afterwards, the Muslims set their eyes on Lapathos. They began their siege, and for several days they attempted to induce the inhabitants to surrender for peace. Seeing no response from them, the Muslims began bombarding the city with mangonels from all sides. Seeing no help was coming, the garrison surrendered. The Muslims spared the inhabitants in exchange for the gold and silver in the city. The treasures of the city, alongside plunder gained in the campaign, were loaded in ships and set sail to Syria in victory.

At that time, Mu'awiya is said to have constructed mosques and founded a new city on the island. He stationed men from Baalbek there as a garrison and provided them with salaries.

== Aftermath ==
The Muslim garrison remained in Cyprus for three decades. During the reign of Yazid I, he ordered the withdrawal of the Muslim garrison from there since it was too expensive to keep. In 688, the Umayyad caliph Abd al-Malik ibn Marwan and Justinian II reached an agreement to rule Cyprus as a condominium. For the next three centuries, the island enjoyed a unique position between the Muslim and Christian worlds.

== Sources ==
- Hoyland, Robert G. (2014). In God's Path: The Arab Conquests and the Creation of an Islamic Empire. Oxford University Press. ISBN 9780199916368.
- Petersen, Leif Inge Ree (2013). Siege Warfare and Military Organization in the Successor States (400–800 AD): Byzantium, the West and Islam. Brill. ISBN 9789004254466.
- Kennedy, Hugh (2007). The Great Arab Conquests: How the Spread of Islam Changed the World We Live In. Da Capo Press. ISBN 978-0-306-81585-0.
- Izdebski, Adam; Mulryan, Michael (2019). Environment and Society in the Long Late Antiquity. Brill. ISBN 9789004392083.
